In July 2016, the International Union for Conservation of Nature (IUCN) listed 4069 least concern arthropod species. Of all evaluated arthropod species, 43% are listed as least concern. 
The IUCN also lists 27 arthropod subspecies as least concern.

No subpopulations of arthropods have been evaluated by the IUCN.

This is a complete list of least concern arthropod species and subspecies as evaluated by the IUCN.

Centipedes
Mecistocephalus angusticeps

Arachnids
There are 21 arachnid species assessed as least concern.

Spiders

Argyrodes rostratus
Fimbriated striated burrowing spider (Chilobrachys fimbriatus)
Eastern Indian striated burrowing spider (Chilobrachys hardwicki)
Cryptothele alluaudi
Damastes validus
Adanson's house jumper (Hasarius adansoni)
Heliophanus activus
Heteroonops tetraspinosus
Microdipoena elsae
Myrmarachne constricta
Noideattella assumptia
Pelicinus marmoratus
Indian ornamental (Poecilotheria regalis)
Pritha heikkii
Rhacocnemis guttatus
Selenops secretus

Schizomida
Ovozomus similis

Pseudoscorpions

Aldabrinus aldabrinus
Feaella affinis
Geogarypus ocellatus
Oratemnus brevidigitatus

Branchiopoda
Giant fairy shrimp (Branchinecta gigas)

Millipedes

Doratogonus annulipes
Doratogonus castaneus
Doratogonus cristulatus
Doratogonus falcatus
Doratogonus flavifilis
Doratogonus krausi
Doratogonus levigatus
Doratogonus montanus
Doratogonus rugifrons
Doratogonus xanthopus

Malacostracans
Malacostraca includes crabs, lobsters, crayfish, shrimp, krill, woodlice, and many others. There are 1193 malacostracan species and 15 malacostracan subspecies assessed as least concern.

Isopods
Thermosphaeroma subequalum

Decapods
There are 1191 decapod species and 15 decapod subspecies assessed as least concern.

Parastacids

Orambato (Astacoides granulimanus)
Astacopsis franklinii
Astacopsis tricornis
Cherax bicarinatus
Smooth marron (Cherax cainii)
Cusped crayfish (Cherax cuspidatus)
Slender yabby (Cherax dispar)
Koonac (Cherax preissii)
Redclaw (Cherax quadricarinatus)
Gilgies (Cherax quinquecarinatus)
Cherax rhynchotus
Engaeus cisternarius
Engaeus cunicularius
Engaeus cymus
Engaeus fossor
Engaeus fultoni
Engaeus hemicirratulus
Engaeus lengana
Engaeus leptorhynchus
Engaeus lyelli
Engaeus mairener
Engaeus merosetosus
Engaeus orientalis
Engaeus quadrimanus
Engaeus sericatus
Engaeus strictifrons
Engaeus tayatea
Engaeus tuberculatus
Engaewa similis
Engaewa subcoerulea
Euastacus australasiensis
Euastacus dangadi
Gippsland spiny crayfish (Euastacus kershawi)
Euastacus neohirsutus
Euastacus reductus
Euastacus spinifer
Euastacus valentulus
Euastacus yanga
Geocharax tasmanicus
Ombrastacoides brevirostris
Ombrastacoides decemdentatus
Ombrastacoides huonensis
Ombrastacoides leptomerus
Paranephrops planifrons
Paranephrops zealandicus
Parastacus pilimanus
Spinastacoides catinipalmus
Spinastacoides inermis
Spinastacoides insignis

Gecarcinucids

Adeleana chapmani
Arachnothelphusa kadamaiana
Arachnothelphusa rhadamanthysi
Arachnothelphusa terrapes
Austrothelphusa agassizi
Austrothelphusa angustifrons
Austrothelphusa raceki
Austrothelphusa transversa
Bakousa sarawakensis
Balssiathelphusa cursor
Barythelphusa cunicularis
Barythelphusa guerini
Barythelphusa jacquemontii
Ceylonthelphusa rugosa
Ceylonthelphusa sentosa
Ceylonthelphusa soror
Currothelphusa asserpes
Cylindrothelphusa steniops
Esanthelphusa chiangmai
Esanthelphusa denchaii
Esanthelphusa dugasti
Esanthelphusa fangensis
Esanthelphusa nimoafi
Esanthelphusa phetchaburi
Gecarcinucus jaquemontii
Geelvinkia darnei
Geithusa lentiginosa
Heterothelphusa insolita
Holthuisana alba
Holthuisana biroi
Holthuisana boesemani
Holthuisana subconvexa
Irmengardia pilosimana
Lamella lamellifrons
Mahatha adonis
Mahatha ornatipes
Maydelliathelphusa harpax
Maydelliathelphusa lugubris
Maydelliathelphusa masoniana
Mekhongthelphusa brandti
Niasathelphusa wirzi
Oziothelphusa ceylonensis
Oziothelphusa minneriyaensis
Parathelphusa bogorensis
Parathelphusa celebensis
Parathelphusa ferruginea
Parathelphusa lokaensis
Parathelphusa maculata
Parathelphusa malaysiana
Parathelphusa manguao
Parathelphusa oxygona
Parathelphusa pallida
Parathelphusa pareparensis
Parathelphusa pulcherrima
Parathelphusa rasilis
Parathelphusa sorella
Parathelphusa valida
Perbrinckia scansor
Perithelphusa borneensis
Perithelphusa lehi
Phricotelphusa amnicola
Phricotelphusa deharvengi
Panda crab (Phricotelphusa sirindhorn)
Salangathelphusa brevicarinata
Sartoriana blanfordi
Sartoriana spinigera
Sayamia bangkokensis
Sayamia germaini
Sayamia sexpunctata
Siamthelphusa acutidens
Siamthelphusa improvisa
Siamthelphusa paviei
Siamthelphusa retimanus
Siamthelphusa transversa
Siamthelphusa variegata
Somanniathelphusa brevipodum
Somanniathelphusa dangi
Somanniathelphusa gaoyunensis
Somanniathelphusa grayi
Somanniathelphusa pax
Somanniathelphusa plicatus
Spiralothelphusa hydrodroma
Sundathelphusa aspera
Sundathelphusa boex
Sundathelphusa cassiope
Sundathelphusa cavernicola
Sundathelphusa grapsoides
Sundathelphusa hades
Sundathelphusa tenebrosa
Sundathelphusa urichi
Sundathelphusa vedeniki
Syntripsa flavichela
Syntripsa matannensis
Terrathelphusa kuhli
Terrathelphusa loxophthalma
Terrathelphusa ovis
Thelphusula baramensis
Thelphusula dicerophilus
Thelphusula granosa
Thelphusula hulu
Thelphusula luidana
Thelphusula sabana
Thelphusula styx
Thelphusula tawauensis
Travancoriana convexa
Travancoriana schirnerae

Atyids
Species

Atya africana
Atya crassa
Atya dressleri
Atya gabonensis
Atya innocous
Atya lanipes
Atya margaritacea
Atya scabra
Atyaephyra acheronensis
Atyaephyra desmarestii
Atyaephyra orientalis
Atyaephyra stankoi
Atyaephyra thyamisensis
Atyella brevirostris
Atyoida pilipes
Atyoida serrata
Atyopsis moluccensis
Atyopsis spinipes
Australatya striolata
Caridella cunningtoni
Caridella minuta
Caridella paski
Caridina angulata
Caridina appendiculata
Caridina babaulti
Caridina babaultioides
Caridina bakoensis
Caridina brachydactyla
Caridina brevicarpalis
Caridina bruneiana
Caridina buehleri
Caridina calmani
Bee shrimp (Caridina cantonensis)
Caridina celebensis
Caridina chauhani
Caridina chishuiensis
Caridina cognata
Caridina confusa
Caridina demani
Caridina disparidentata
Caridina elongopoda
Caridina endehensis
Caridina evae
Caridina excavatoides
Caridina fernandoi
Caridina fijiana
Caridina fossarum
Caridina gaesumi
Caridina gracilipes
Caridina gracilirostris
Caridina gracillima
Caridina grandirostris
Caridina hova
Caridina imitatrix
Caridina indistincta
Caridina isaloensis
Caridina jalihali
Caridina johnsoni
Caridina kempi
Caridina lanceifrons
Caridina laoagensis
Caridina leucosticta
Caridina longirostris
Caridina mahalona
Caridina malayensis
Caridina mccullochi
Caridina medifolia
Caridina mertoni
Caridina moeri
Caridina multidentata
Caridina natalensis
Caridina natarajani
Caridina neglecta
Caridina nilotica
Caridina novaecaledoniae
Caridina papuana
Caridina pareparensis
Caridina parvidentata
Caridina peninsularis
Caridina pingi
Caridina prashadi
Caridina pristis
Caridina propinqua
Caridina rapaensis
Caridina rubella
Caridina serratirostris
Caridina shenoyi
Caridina similis
Caridina simoni
Caridina spinula
Caridina sulawesi
Caridina sumatrensis
Caridina temasek
Caridina thambipillai
Caridina togoensis
Caridina typus
Caridina villadolidi
Caridina weberi
Caridina xiphias
Caridina yunnanensis
Caridina zebra
Caridina zeylanica
Caridinides wilkinsi
Caridinopsis chevalieri
Jonga serrei
Limnocaridina iridinae
Limnocaridina latipes
Limnocaridina parvula
Limnocaridina retarius
Limnocaridina similis
Limnocaridina socius
Limnocaridina spinipes
Limnocaridina tanganyikae
Micratya poeyi
Neocaridina denticulata
Neocaridina fukiensis
Neocaridina gracilipoda
Neocaridina hofendopoda
Neocaridina iriomotensis
Neocaridina ishigakiensis
Neocaridina palmata
Neocaridina spinosa
Paracaridina guizhouensis
Paratya australiensis
Paratya boninensis
Paratya bouvieri
Paratya caledonica
Paratya compressa
Paratya curvirostris
Paratya howensis
Paratya improvisa
Paratya intermedia
Paratya typa
Parisia gracilis
Parisia unguis
Potimirim brasiliana
Potimirim glabra
Potimirim potimirim
Sinodina bispinosa
Sinodina yui
Troglocaris anophthalmus
Typhlatya campecheae
Typhlatya mitchelli
Mona cave shrimp (Typhlatya monae)
Typhlatya pearsei

Subspecies

Caridina babaulti basrensis
Caridina babaultioides babaultioides
Caridina indistincta indistincta
Caridina isaloensis grandidieri
Caridina isaloensis isaloensis
Neocaridina denticulata denticulata
Neocaridina palmata meridionalis
Neocaridina palmata palmata

Cambarids
Species and subspecies

Bottlebrush crayfish (Barbicambarus cornutus)
Angular dwarf crawfish (Cambarellus lesliei)
Acocil (Cambarellus montezumae)
Aransas dwarf crawfish (Cambarellus ninae)
Cambarellus occidentalis
Swamp dwarf crayfish (Cambarellus puer)
Cajun dwarf crayfish (Cambarellus shufeldtii)
Brazos dwarf crayfish (Cambarellus texanus)
Cambarellus zempoalensis
Thornytail crayfish (Cambarus acanthura)
Acuminate crayfish (Cambarus acuminatus)
Angled crayfish (Cambarus angularis)
Mitten crayfish (Cambarus asperimanus)
Appalachian brook crayfish (Cambarus bartonii)
Bluegrass crayfish (Cambarus batchi)
Longclaw crayfish (Cambarus buntingi)
Rock crayfish (Cambarus carinirostris)
Red burrowing crayfish (Cambarus carolinus)
Boston Mountains crayfish (Cambarus causeyi)
New river crayfish (Cambarus chasmodactylus)
Chauga river crayfish (Cambarus chaugaensis)
Coosa crayfish (Cambarus coosae)
Hairyfoot crayfish (Cambarus crinipes)
Apalachicola cave crayfish (Cambarus cryptodytes)
Cumberland crayfish (Cambarus cumberlandensis)
Carolina ladle crayfish (Cambarus davidi)
Valley flame crayfish (Cambarus deweesae)
Devil crawfish (Cambarus diogenes)
Boxclaw crayfish (Cambarus distans)
Upland burrowing crayfish (Cambarus dubius)
Tallapoosa crayfish (Cambarus englishi)
Cambarus friaufi
Linear cobalt crayfish (Cambarus gentryi)
Little Tennessee river crayfish (Cambarus georgiae)
Tanback crayfish (Cambarus girardianus)
Twospot crayfish (Cambarus graysoni)
Slackwater crayfish (Cambarus halli)
Prickly cave crayfish (Cambarus hamulatus)
Hiwassee crayfish (Cambarus hiwasseensis)
Rocky river crayfish (Cambarus hobbsorum)
Chattahoochee crayfish (Cambarus howardi)
Cambarus hubbsi
Sandhills spiny crayfish (Cambarus hystricosus)
Carolina foothills crayfish (Cambarus johni)
Variable crayfish (Cambarus latimanus)
Longnose crayfish (Cambarus longirostris)
Atlantic slope crayfish (Cambarus longulus)
Painted devil crayfish (Cambarus ludovicianus)
Freckled crayfish (Cambarus maculatus)
Greensaddle crayfish (Cambarus manningi)
Rusty grave digger (Cambarus miltus)
Monongahela crayfish (Cambarus monongalensis)
Knotty burrowing crayfish (Cambarus nodosus)
Sloped crayfish (Cambarus obstipus)
Ortmann's mudbug (Cambarus ortmanni)
Mountain midget crayfish (Cambarus parvoculus)
Paintedhand mudbug (Cambarus polychromatus)
French broad crayfish (Cambarus reburrus)
Sickle crayfish (Cambarus reduncus)
Pine savannah crayfish (Cambarus reflexus)
Big water crayfish (Cambarus robustus)
Depression crayfish (Cambarus rusticiformis)
Teays river crayfish (Cambarus sciotensis)
Chattooga river crayfish (Cambarus scotti)
Triangleclaw crayfish (Cambarus sphenoides)
Ambiguous crayfish (Cambarus striatus)
Cavespring crayfish (Cambarus tenebrosus)
Little brown mudbug (Cambarus thomai)
Blackbarred crayfish (Cambarus unestami)
Lavender burrowing crayfish (Fallicambarus byersi)
Timberlands burrowing crayfish (Fallicambarus caesius)
Texas prairie crayfish (Fallicambarus devastator)
Digger crayfish (Fallicambarus fodiens)
Houston burrowing crayfish (Fallicambarus houstonensis)
Big thicket burrowing crayfish (Fallicambarus kountzeae)
Old prairie digger (Fallicambarus macneesei)
Saline burrowing crayfish (Fallicambarus strawni)
Sabine fencing crayfish (Faxonella beyeri)
Blair's fencing crayfish (Faxonella blairi)
Ditch fencing crayfish (Faxonella clypeata)
Prominence riverlet crayfish (Hobbseus prominens)
Redspotted stream crayfish (Orconectes acares)
Alabama crayfish (Orconectes alabamensis)
Southern cave crayfish (Orconectes australis)
Barren river crayfish (Orconectes barrenensis)
North Carolina spiny crayfish (Orconectes carolinensis)
Orconectes causeyi
Chickasaw crayfish (Orconectes chickasawae)
Slender crayfish (Orconectes compressus)
Flint river crayfish (Orconectes cooperi)
Spiny stream crayfish (Orconectes cristavarius)
Conchas crayfish (Orconectes deanae)
Painted crayfish (Orconectes difficilis)
Saddle crayfish (Orconectes durelli)
Reticulate crayfish (Orconectes erichsonianus)
Ets crayfish (Orconectes etnieri)
Surgeon crayfish (Orconectes forceps)
Belted crayfish (Orconectes harrisonii)
Teche painted crayfish (Orconectes hathawayi)
Teche painted crayfish (Orconectes hathawayi hathawayi)
Woodland crayfish (Orconectes hylas)
Orconectes illinoiensis
Calico crayfish (Orconectes immunis)
Indiana crayfish (Orconectes indianensis)
Ghost crayfish (Orconectes inermis)
Kentucky river crayfish (Orconectes juvenilis)
Kentucky crayfish (Orconectes kentuckiensis)
Shrimp crayfish (Orconectes lancifer)
Little river creek crayfish (Orconectes leptogonopodus)
Spinycheek crayfish (Orconectes limosus)
Longpincered crayfish (Orconectes longidigitus)
Golden crayfish (Orconectes luteus)
Neosho midget crayfish (Orconectes macrus)
Saddlebacked crayfish (Orconectes medius)
Meek's crayfish (Orconectes meeki)
Mena crayfish (Orconectes menae)
Wonderful crayfish (Orconectes mirus)
Water nymph crayfish (Orconectes nais)
Midget crayfish (Orconectes nana)
Gapped ringed crayfish (Orconectes neglectus)
Allegheny crayfish (Orconectes obscurus)
Ozark crayfish (Orconectes ozarkae)
Mottled crayfish (Orconectes pagei)
Orconectes palmeri
Mammoth cave crayfish (Orconectes pellucidus)
Complete crayfish (Orconectes perfectus)
Bigclaw crayfish (Orconectes placidus)
Northern clearwater crayfish (Orconectes propinquus)
Spothanded crayfish (Orconectes punctimanus)
Phallic crayfish (Orconectes putnami)
Rough river crayfish (Orconectes rafinesquei)
Fishhook crayfish (Orconectes rhoadesi)
Mild river crayfish (Orconectes ronaldi)
Rusty crayfish (Orconectes rusticus)
Sanborn's crayfish (Orconectes sanbornii)
Sloan's crayfish (Orconectes sloanii)
Coosa river spiny crayfish (Orconectes spinosus)
Little Wabash crayfish (Orconectes stannardi)
Caney mountain cave crayfish (Orconectes stygocaneyi)
Western highland crayfish (Orconectes tricuspis)
Powerful crayfish (Orconectes validus)
Virile crayfish (Orconectes virilis)
Williams crayfish (Orconectes williamsi)
Hatchie river crayfish (Procambarus ablusus)
Procambarus acanthophorus
Procambarus achilli
Sharpnose crayfish (Procambarus acutissimus)
White river crayfish (Procambarus acutus)
Vidalia crayfish (Procambarus advena)
Blue crayfish (Procambarus alleni)
Wandering crayfish (Procambarus barbatus)
Ribbon crayfish (Procambarus bivittatus)
Santee crayfish (Procambarus blandingii)
Procambarus caballeroi
Poor crayfish (Procambarus caritus)
Blueclaw chimney crawfish (Procambarus ceruleus)
Cedar creek crayfish (Procambarus chacei)
Red swamp crayfish (Procambarus clarkii)
Cockscomb crayfish (Procambarus clemmeri)
Procambarus cuevachicae
Red river burrowing crayfish (Procambarus curdi)
Southwestern creek crayfish (Procambarus dupratzi)
Edisto crayfish (Procambarus echinatus)
Black mottled crayfish (Procambarus enoplosternum)
Humpback crayfish (Procambarus epicyrtus)
Deceitful crayfish (Procambarus fallax)
Spiny-tail crayfish (Procambarus fitzpatricki)
Twin crawfish (Procambarus geminus)
Procambarus gonopodcristatus
Prairie crayfish (Procambarus gracilis)
Egyptian crayfish (Procambarus hagenianus)
Straightedge crayfish (Procambarus hayi)
Procambarus hidalgoensis
Marsh crayfish (Procambarus hinei)
Shaggy crayfish (Procambarus hirsutus)
Procambarus hoffmani
Ornate crayfish (Procambarus howellae)
Jackknife crayfish (Procambarus hubbelli)
Smoothnose crayfish (Procambarus hybus)
Cut crayfish (Procambarus incilis)
Javelin crayfish (Procambarus jaculus)
Free state chimney crawfish (Procambarus kensleyi)
Hatchet crayfish (Procambarus kilbyi)
Mobile crayfish (Procambarus lecontei)
Blacknose crayfish (Procambarus leonensis)
Osage burrowing crayfish (Procambarus liberorum)
Procambarus llamasi
Mane crayfish (Procambarus lophotus)
Vampire crayfish (Procambarus lucifugus)
Lame crayfish (Procambarus mancus)
Procambarus mexicanus
Procambarus mirandai
Red river crayfish (Procambarus natchitochae)
Neches crayfish (Procambarus nechesae)
Blackbelted crayfish (Procambarus nigrocinctus)
Procambarus oaxacae
Okaloosa crayfish (Procambarus okaloosae)
Procambarus olmecorum
Ouachita river crayfish (Procambarus ouachitae)
Peninsula crayfish (Procambarus paeninsulanus)
Bismark burrowing crayfish (Procambarus parasimulans)
Procambarus pilosimanus
Flatnose crayfish (Procambarus planirostris)
Croatan crayfish (Procambarus plumimanus)
Christmas tree crayfish (Procambarus pygmaeus)
Procambarus riojae
Seminole crayfish (Procambarus seminolae)
Gulf crayfish (Procambarus shermani)
Southern plains crayfish (Procambarus simulans)
White tubercled crayfish (Procambarus spiculifer)
Choctawhatchee crayfish (Procambarus suttkusi)
Mole crayfish (Procambarus talpoides)
Procambarus toltecae
Eastern red swamp crayfish (Procambarus troglodytes)
Procambarus truculentus
Giant bearded crayfish (Procambarus tulanei)
Grainy crayfish (Procambarus verrucosus)
Sly crayfish (Procambarus versutus)
Vernal crayfish (Procambarus viaeviridis)
Percy's creek crayfish (Procambarus vioscai)

Potamonautids

Erimetopus brazzae
Foza raimundi
Hydrothelphusa agilis
Hydrothelphusa bombetokensis
Hydrothelphusa goudoti
Hydrothelphusa madagascariensis
Hydrothelphusa vencesi
Spiny river crab (Liberonautes chaperi)
Common creek crab (Liberonautes latidactylus)
Pale swamp crab (Liberonautes paludicolis)
Malagasya antongilensis
Platythelphusa armata
Platythelphusa conculcata
Platythelphusa denticulata
Platythelphusa echinata
Platythelphusa immaculata
Platythelphusa maculata
Platythelphusa polita
Platythelphusa tuberculata
Potamonautes alluaudi
Potamonautes aloysiisabaudiae
Anchieta's river crab (Potamonautes anchietae)
Potamonautes antheus
Potamonautes ballayi
Potamonautes bayonianus
Potamonautes berardi
Brinck's river crab (Potamonautes brincki)
Potamonautes calcaratus
Bright river crab (Potamonautes clarus)
Potamonautes congoensis
Toothed river crab (Potamonautes dentatus)
Flat river crab (Potamonautes depressus)
Potamonautes dybowskii
Ecorsse's river crab (Potamonautes ecorssei)
Potamonautes emini
Potamonautes granularis
Potamonautes jeanneli
Potamonautes johnstoni
Potamonautes langi
Potamonautes lirrangensis
Potamonautes loashiensis
Potamonautes loveni
Potamonautes loveridgei
Potamonautes margaritarius
Potamonautes minor
Potamonautes neumanni
Potamonautes niloticus
Potamonautes obesus
Potamonautes odhneri
Potamonautes paecilei
Potamonautes parvicorpus
Potamonautes parvispina
Cape river crab (Potamonautes perlatus)
Potamonautes perparvus
Potamonautes platynotus
Potamonautes rukwanzi
Natal river crab (Potamonautes sidneyi)
Potamonautes stanleyensis
Potamonautes suprasulcatus
Single-spined river crab (Potamonautes unispinus)
Potamonautes walderi
Warren's river crab (Potamonautes warreni)
Potamonemus mambilorum
Seychellum alluaudi
African river crab (Sudanonautes africanus)
Aubry's crab (Sudanonautes aubryi)
Sudanonautes chavanesii
Sudanonautes faradjensis
Flower's crab (Sudanonautes floweri)
Sudanonautes granulatus
Kagoro stream crab (Sudanonautes kagoroensis)
Monod's savanna crab (Sudanonautes monodi)

Pseudothelphusids

Achlidon agrestis
Chaceus caecus
Chaceus pearsei
Chaceus turikensis
Epilobocera cubensis
Epilobocera sinuatifrons
Fredius beccarii
Fredius chaffanjoni
Fredius denticulatus
Fredius estevisi
Fredius fittkaui
Fredius platyacanthus
Fredius reflexifrons
Fredius stenolobus
Guinotia dentata
Hypolobocera aequatorialis
Hypolobocera beieri
Hypolobocera bouvieri
Hypolobocera chilensis
Hypolobocera chocoensis
Hypolobocera conradi
Hypolobocera gorgonensis
Hypolobocera lloroensis
Hypolobocera martelathani
Hypolobocera meineli
Hypolobocera peruviana
Kingsleya latifrons
Kingsleya siolii
Kingsleya ytupora
Lindacatalina orientalis
Moritschus henrici
Neopseudothelphusa simoni
Neostrengeria appressa
Neostrengeria botti
Neostrengeria boyacensis
Neostrengeria charalensis
Neostrengeria guenteri
Neostrengeria lasallei
Neostrengeria lindigiana
Neostrengeria macropa
Neostrengeria monterrodendoensis
Neostrengeria niceforoi
Neostrengeria tencalanensis
Neostrengeria tonensis
Odontothelphusa maxillipes
Orthothelphusa holthuisi
Orthothelphusa venezuelensis
Phallangothelphusa dispar
Phallangothelphusa magdalenensis
Potamocarcinus armatus
Potamocarcinus magnus
Potamocarcinus nicaraguensis
Potamocarcinus richmondi
Prionothelphusa eliasi
Pseudothelphusa americana
Pseudothelphusa belliana
Pseudothelphusa dilatata
Pseudothelphusa jouyi
Ptychophallus barbillaensis
Ptychophallus colombianus
Ptychophallus tumimanus
Raddaus bocourti
Raddaus orestrius
Rodriguezus garmani
Rodriguezus iturbei
Rodriguezus ranchograndensis
Strengeriana chaparralensis
Strengeriana fuhrmanni
Strengeriana maniformis
Strengeriana restrepoi
Strengeriana risaraldensis
Strengeriana villaensis
Typhlopseudothelphusa juberthiei
Typhlopseudothelphusa mitchelli
Zilchia aspoekorum
Zilchia zilchi

Potamids

Acanthopotamon martensi
Alcomon lophocarpus
Amamiku amamensis
Aparapotamon grahami
Bottapotamon fukienense
Candidiopotamon kumejimense
Candidiopotamon okinawense
Rumsfeld stream crab (Candidiopotamon rathbunae)
Cerberusa caeca
Cerberusa tipula
Chinapotamon depressum
Daipotamon minos
Demanietta huahin
Demanietta khirikhan
Demanietta lansak
Demanietta nakhonsi
Demanietta renongensis
Demanietta suanphung
Demanietta tritrungensis
Donopotamon haii
Eosamon boonyaratae
Eosamon smithianum
Erebusa calobates
Huang Ze gray crab (Geothelphusa albogilva)
Yuen Chak thick crab (Geothelphusa ancylophallus)
Geothelphusa aramotoi
Two-color crab (Geothelphusa bicolor)
Blue-grey ze crab (Geothelphusa caesia)
Sun Moon Lake ze crab (Geothelphusa candidiensis)
Gray-taek crab (Geothelphusa cinerea)
Geothelphusa dehaani
Ze great crab (Geothelphusa dolichopodes)
Geothelphusa exigua
Geothelphusa fulva
Geothelphusa grandiovata
Mao Zedong more than crab (Geothelphusa hirsuta)
Geothelphusa iheya
Geothelphusa kumejima
Geothelphusa marginata
Geothelphusa minei
Chak Ko Shan crab (Geothelphusa monticola)
Nan Xize crab (Geothelphusa nanhsi)
Geothelphusa obtusipes
Yellow-green crab (Geothelphusa olea)
Geothelphusa sakomotoana
Geothelphusa shokitai
She crab (Geothelphusa tsayae)
Hainanpotamon glabrum
Hainanpotamon rubrum
Himalayapotamon atkinsonianum
Himalayapotamon emphyseteum
Himalayapotamon koolooense
Ibanum aethes
Indochinamon bavi
Indochinamon phongnha
Isolapotamon anomalum
Isolapotamon collinsi
Isolapotamon consobrinum
Isolapotamon griswoldi
Isolapotamon ingeri
Isolapotamon kinabaluense
Isolapotamon nimboni
Johora grallator
Johora gua
Johora hoiseni
Johora intermedia
Johora murphyi
Johora tahanensis
Johora thaiana
Larnaudia chaiyaphumi
Lobothelphusa woodmasoni
Malayopotamon batak
Malayopotamon brevimarginatum
Mediapotamon leishanense
Nanhaipotamon dongyinense
Nanhaipotamon hongkongense
Neilupotamon physalisum
Neolarnaudia buesekomae
Ovitamon artifrons
Phaibulamon stilipes
Potamiscus elaphrius
Potamiscus tumidulum
Potamon algeriense
Potamon bilobatum
Potamon gedrosianum
Potamon hueceste
Potamon magnum
Potamon mesopotamicum
Potamon persicum
Potamon ruttneri
Potamon strouhali
Potamon transcaspicum
Ryukyum yaeyamense
Sinolapotamon patelifer
Sinopotamon acutum
Sinopotamon anyuanense
Sinopotamon bilobatum
Sinopotamon chekiangense
Sinopotamon chishuiense
Sinopotamon cladopodum
Sinopotamon convexum
Sinopotamon davidi
Sinopotamon decrescentum
Sinopotamon denticulatum
Sinopotamon depressum
Sinopotamon exiguum
Sinopotamon honanese
Sinopotamon huitongense
Sinopotamon jiangkuoense
Sinopotamon jianglenense
Sinopotamon jichiense
Sinopotamon jiujiangense
Sinopotamon kwanhsienense
Sinopotamon lansi
Sinopotamon nanlingense
Sinopotamon nanum
Sinopotamon obliquum
Sinopotamon planum
Sinopotamon shensiense
Sinopotamon styxum
Sinopotamon teritisum
Sinopotamon wanzaiense
Sinopotamon xiangxiense
Sinopotamon xingshanense
Sinopotamon yaanense
Sinopotamon yangtsekiense
Socotra pseudocardisoma
Socotrapotamon socotrensis
Stelomon pruinosum
Stoliczia ekavibhathai
Stoliczia rafflesi
Stoliczia stoliczkana
Tenuilapotamon latilum
Terrapotamon abbotti
Terrapotamon palian
Terrapotamon phaibuli
Thaiphusa sirikit
Thaipotamon chulabhorn
Thaipotamon dansai
Thaipotamon lomkao
Tiwaripotamon annamense
Trichopotamon sikkimensis

Palaemonids
Species

Arachnochium mirabile
Coutierella tonkinensis
Creaseria morleyi
Cryphiops caementarius
Cryphiops perspicax
Exopalaemon annandalei
Exopalaemon modestus
Leptocarpus fluminicola
Leptocarpus potamiscus
Leptopalaemon gagadjui
Macrobrachium acanthurus
Macrobrachium aemulum
Macrobrachium ahkowi
Macrobrachium altifrons
Macrobrachium amazonicum
Macrobrachium americanum
Macrobrachium amplimanus
Macrobrachium aracamuni
Macrobrachium asperulum
Macrobrachium assamense
Macrobrachium auratum
Macrobrachium australe
Macrobrachium australiense
Macrobrachium bariense
Macrobrachium birmanicum
Macrobrachium bombayense
Macrobrachium borellii
Macrobrachium brasiliense
Macrobrachium bullatum
Macrobrachium caledonicum
Macrobrachium callirrhoe
Macrobrachium carcinus
Macrobrachium catonium
Macrobrachium cavernicola
Macrobrachium chevalieri
Macrobrachium clymene
Macrobrachium cortezi
Macrobrachium crenulatum
Macrobrachium dalatense
Macrobrachium dayanum
Macrobrachium depressimanum
Macrobrachium dienbienphuense
Macrobrachium digueti
Macrobrachium dolichodactylus
Macrobrachium duri
Macrobrachium dux
Macrobrachium empulipke
Macrobrachium equidens
Macrobrachium esculentum
Macrobrachium faustinum
Macrobrachium ferreirai
Macrobrachium feunteuni
Macrobrachium forcipatum
Macrobrachium formosense
Macrobrachium gallus
Macrobrachium gangeticum
Macrobrachium gracilirostre
Macrobrachium grandimanus
Macrobrachium hainanense
Macrobrachium hancocki
Macrobrachium handschini
Macrobrachium hendersodayanum
Macrobrachium hendersoni
Macrobrachium heterochirus
Macrobrachium hirsutimanus
Macrobrachium hobbsi
Macrobrachium horstii
Macrobrachium idae
Macrobrachium idella
Macrobrachium iheringi
Macrobrachium indicum
Macrobrachium inpa
Macrobrachium japonicum
Macrobrachium jaroense
Macrobrachium jelskii
Macrobrachium kelianense
Macrobrachium kistnense
Macrobrachium koombooloomba
Macrobrachium lamarrei
Macrobrachium lanatum
Macrobrachium lanceifrons
Macrobrachium lanchesteri
Macrobrachium lar
Macrobrachium latidactylus
Macrobrachium latimanus
Macrobrachium lepidactyloides
Macrobrachium lepidactylus
Macrobrachium leucodactylus
Macrobrachium lopopodus
Macrobrachium lorentzi
Macrobrachium lucifugum
Macrobrachium macrobrachion
Macrobrachium maculatum
Macrobrachium malayanum
Macrobrachium malcolmsonii
Macrobrachium mammillodactylus
Macrobrachium manningi
Macrobrachium mazatecum
Macrobrachium michoacanus
Macrobrachium microps
Macrobrachium mieni
Macrobrachium moorei
Macrobrachium nattereri
Macrobrachium natulorum
Macrobrachium neglectum
Macrobrachium niloticum
Macrobrachium niphanae
Macrobrachium nipponense
Macrobrachium nobilii
Macrobrachium novaehollandiae
Macrobrachium ohione
Macrobrachium olfersii
Macrobrachium panamense
Macrobrachium patheinense
Macrobrachium patsa
Macrobrachium peguense
Macrobrachium petersii
Macrobrachium pilimanus
Macrobrachium placidulum
Macrobrachium placidum
Macrobrachium platycheles
Macrobrachium platyrostris
Macrobrachium potiuna
Macrobrachium rathbunae
Macrobrachium reyesi
Macrobrachium rhodochir
Macrobrachium rodriguezi
Giant river prawn (Macrobrachium rosenbergii)
Macrobrachium rude
Macrobrachium sabanus
Macrobrachium saigonense
Macrobrachium sankollii
Macrobrachium sbordonii
Macrobrachium scabriculum
Macrobrachium shokitai
Macrobrachium sintangense
Macrobrachium sirindhorn
Macrobrachium siwalikense
Macrobrachium sollaudii
Macrobrachium spinipes
Macrobrachium spinosum
Macrobrachium sulcatus
Macrobrachium sundaicum
Macrobrachium suongae
Macrobrachium superbum
Macrobrachium surinamicum
Macrobrachium tenellum
Macrobrachium thai
Macrobrachium tiwarii
Macrobrachium tolmerum
Macrobrachium totonacum
Macrobrachium tratense
Macrobrachium urayang
Macrobrachium venustum
Macrobrachium vicconi
Macrobrachium villalobosi
Macrobrachium villosimanus
Macrobrachium vollenhoveni
Macrobrachium weberi
Macrobrachium yui
Palaemon capensis
Palaemonetes antennarius
Palaemonetes argentinus
Palaemonetes australis
Palaemonetes carteri
Palaemonetes hobbsi
Palaemonetes ivonicus
Palaemonetes kadiakensis
Palaemonetes mercedae
Palaemonetes paludosus
Palaemonetes sinensis
Pseudopalaemon amazonensis
Pseudopalaemon bouvieri
Pseudopalaemon chryseus
Pseudopalaemon gouldingi
Pseudopalaemon nigramnis

Subspecies

Macrobrachium altifrons altifrons
Macrobrachium assamense assamense
Macrobrachium idella georgii
Macrobrachium idella idella
Macrobrachium lamarrei lamarrei
Macrobrachium malcolmsonii malcolmsonii

Trichodactylids

Avotrichodactylus constrictus
Bottiella niceforei
Dilocarcinus pagei
Dilocarcinus septemdentatus
Forsteria venezuelensis
Fredilocarcinus musmuschiae
Goyazana castelnaui
Goyazana rotundicauda
Moreirocarcinus chacei
Moreirocarcinus emarginatus
Moreirocarcinus laevifrons
Poppiana argentiniana
Poppiana bulbifer
Poppiana dentata
Rotundovaldivia latidens
Sylviocarcinus australis
Sylviocarcinus devillei
Sylviocarcinus maldonadoensis
Sylviocarcinus pictus
Sylviocarcinus piriformis
Trichodactylus borellianus
Trichodactylus dentatus
Trichodactylus ehrhardti
Trichodactylus faxoni
Trichodactylus fluviatilis
Trichodactylus kensleyi
Trichodactylus panoplus
Trichodactylus petropolitanus
Trichodactylus quinquedentatus
Valdivia camerani
Valdivia cururuensis
Valdivia novemdentata
Valdivia serrata
Zilchiopsis collastinensis
Zilchiopsis oronensis

Spiny lobsters

Southern rock lobster (Jasus edwardsii)
Cape rock lobster (Jasus lalandii)
Tristan rock lobster (Jasus tristani)
African spear lobster (Linuparus somniosus)
Oriental spear lobster (Linuparus sordidus)
Japanese spear lobster (Linuparus trigonus)
Japanese furrow lobster (Nupalirus japonicus)
Caribbean furry lobster (Palinurellus gundlachi)
Indo-pacific furry lobster (Palinurellus wieneckii)
Natal spiny lobster (Palinurus delagoae)
Southern spiny lobster (Palinurus gilchristi)
Pink spiny lobster (Palinurus mauritanicus)
American blunthorn lobster (Palinustus truncatus)
Unicorn blunthorn lobster (Palinustus unicornutus)
Japanese blunthorn lobster (Palinustus waguensis)
Australian spiny lobster (Panulirus cygnus)
Brown spiny lobster (Panulirus echinatus)
White-whiskered coral crayfish (Panulirus femoristriga)
Spotted spiny lobster (Panulirus guttatus)
Scalloped spiny lobster (Panulirus homarus)
Blue spiny lobster (Panulirus inflatus)
California spiny lobster (Panulirus interruptus)
Longlegged spiny lobster (Panulirus longipes)
Ornate spiny lobster (Panulirus ornatus)
Pronghorn spiny lobster (Panulirus penicillatus)
Mud spiny lobster (Panulirus polyphagus)
Painted spiny lobster (Panulirus versicolor)
Chilean jagged lobster (Projasus bahamondei)
Cape jagged lobster (Projasus parkeri)
Banded whip lobster (Puerulus angulatus)
Arabian whip lobster (Puerulus sewelli)
Velvet whip lobster (Puerulus velutinus)
Green rock lobster (Sagmariasus verreauxi)

Lobsters

Atlantic deep-sea lobster (Acanthacaris caeca)
Prickly deep-sea lobster (Acanthacaris tenuimana)
Sculptured lobster (Eunephrops cadenasi)
American lobster (Homarus americanus)
European lobster (Homarus gammarus)
Andaman lobster (Metanephrops andamanicus)
Northwest lobster (Metanephrops australiensis)
Caribbean lobster (Metanephrops binghami)
Bight lobster (Metanephrops boschmai)
New Zealand lobster (Metanephrops challengeri)
African lobster (Metanephrops mozambicus)
Neptune lobster (Metanephrops neptunus)
Siboga lobster (Metanephrops sibogae)
China lobster (Metanephrops sinensis)
Velvet lobster (Metanephrops velutinus)
Norway lobster (Nephrops norvegicus)
Spinetail lobsterette (Nephropsis acanthura)
Florida lobsterette (Nephropsis aculeata)
Prickly lobsterette (Nephropsis agassizii)
Scarlet lobsterette (Nephropsis atlantica)
Ridge-back lobsterette (Nephropsis carpenteri)
Gladiator lobsterette (Nephropsis ensirostris)
Ruby lobsterette (Nephropsis neglecta)
Pacific lobsterette (Nephropsis occidentalis)
Two-toned lobsterette (Nephropsis rosea)
Indian Ocean lobsterette (Nephropsis stewarti)
Red and white lobsterette (Nephropsis suhmi)
Grooved lobsterette (Nephropsis sulcata)
Thaumastocheles dochmiodon
Pacific pincer lobster (Thaumastocheles japonicus)
Atlantic pincer lobster (Thaumastocheles zaleucus)
Bellator lobster (Thymopides grobovi)
Patagonian lobsterette (Thymops birsteini)
Nilenta lobsterette (Thymopsis nilenta)

Slipper lobsters

Acantharctus ornatus
Antarctus mawsoni
Antipodarctus aoteanus
Rough Spanish lobster (Arctides antipodarum)
Small Spanish lobster (Arctides guineensis)
Royal Spanish lobster (Arctides regalis)
Bathyarctus chani
Faxon slipper lobster (Bathyarctus faxoni)
Bathyarctus rubens
Biarctus pumilus
Pygmy slipper lobster (Biarctus sordidus)
Fiji locust lobster (Biarctus vitiensis)
Locust lobster (Chelarctus aureus)
Chelarctus cultrifer
Crenarctus bicuspidatus
Crenarctus crenatus
Eduarctus aesopius
Striated locust lobster (Eduarctus martensii)
Eduarctus modestus
Eduarctus pyrrhonotus
Eduarctus reticulatus
Shield fan lobster (Evibacus princeps)
Galearctus aurora
Galearctus avulsus
Galearctus kitanoviriosus
Galearctus timidus
Gibbularctus gibberosus
Velvet fan lobster (Ibacus alticrenatus)
Serrate fan lobster (Ibacus brevipes)
Glabrous fan lobster (Ibacus brucei)
Ibacus chacei
Smooth fan lobster (Ibacus novemdentatus)
Butterfly fan lobster (Ibacus peronii)
Sculptured mitten lobster (Parribacus antarcticus)
Caledonian mitten lobster (Parribacus caledonicus)
Blue-back locust lobster (Petrarctus brevicornis)
Petrarctus demani
Petrarctus holthuisi
Hunchback locust lobster (Petrarctus rugosus)
Petrarctus veliger
Two-spot locust lobster (Remiarctus bertholdii)
Soft locust lobster (Scammarctus batei)
Spanish slipper lobster (Scyllarides aequinoctialis)
Brazilian slipper lobster (Scyllarides brasiliensis)
Hooded slipper lobster (Scyllarides deceptor)
Cape slipper lobster (Scyllarides elisabethae)
Aesop slipper lobster (Scyllarides haanii)
Ridged slipper lobster (Scyllarides nodifer)
Blunt slipper lobster (Scyllarides squammosus)
Clamkiller slipper lobster (Scyllarides tridacnophaga)
Scyllarus americanus
Small European locust lobster (Scyllarus arctus)
Scyllarus caparti
Scyllarus chacei
Scyllarus depressus
Pygmy locust lobster (Scyllarus pygmaeus)
Flathead lobster (Thenus orientalis)

Polychelids

Cardus crucifer
Homeryon asper
Pentacheles gibbus
Pentacheles laevis
Pentacheles obscurus
Pentacheles snyderi
Pentacheles validus
Polycheles amemiyai
Polycheles baccatus
Polycheles coccifer
Polycheles enthrix
Polycheles kermadecensis
Polycheles martini
Polycheles perarmatus
Polycheles tanneri
Polycheles typhlops
Stereomastis aculeata
Stereomastis auriculata
Stereomastis cerata
Stereomastis evexa
Stereomastis galil
Stereomastis helleri
Stereomastis nana
Stereomastis pacifica
Stereomastis panglao
Pink blind lobster (Stereomastis phosphorus)
Stereomastis polita
Flatback lobster (Stereomastis sculpta)
Stereomastis suhmi
Stereomastis surda
Stereomastis talismani
Stereomastis trispinosa
Willemoesia forceps
Willemoesia leptodactyla

Other decapod species

Danube crayfish (Astacus leptodactylus)
Desmocaris trispinosa
Flaming reef lobster (Enoplometopus antillensis)
Hawaiian red lobster (Enoplometopus occidentalis)
Euryrhynchus amazoniensis
Euryrhynchus burchelli
Euryrhynchus pemoni
Euryrhynchus wrzesniowskii
Pilose crayfish (Pacifastacus gambelii)
Signal crayfish (Pacifastacus leniusculus)
Potamalpheops monodi
Potamalpheops stygicola
Xiphocaris elongata

Krill species
Antarctic krill (Euphausia superba)

Insects
There are 2843 insect species and 12 insect subspecies assessed as least concern.

Earwigs
Spirolabia browni

Blattodea

Desmosia alluaudi
Distichopis stylopyga
Miriamrothschildia gardineri
Miriamrothschildia labrynthica
Parasigmoidella reticulata
Sliferia acuticerca
Sliferia depressiceps
Sliferia lineaticollis

Phasmatodea species

Alluaud's stick insect (Carausius alluaudi)
Gardiner's stick insect (Carausius gardineri)
Seychelles stick insect (Carausius sechellensis)
Seychelles leaf insect (Phyllium bioculatum)

Termites
Nasutitermes maheensis
Neotermes laticollis

Orthoptera
There are 184 species and six subspecies in the order Orthoptera assessed as least concern.

Crickets

Metioche perpusilla
Cyprian stripe-headed cricket (Modicogryllus cyprius)
Cretan glandular cricket (Ovaliptila lindbergi)
Epirus glandular cricket (Ovaliptila newmanae)
Polionemobius modestus
Zarceomorpha abdita
Zarceus fallaciosus

Acridids

Slender burrowing grasshopper (Acrotylus patruelis)
Tenerife rock grasshopper (Arminda brunneri)
Gran Canaria rock grasshopper (Arminda burri)
Fuerteventura rock grasshopper (Arminda fuerteventurae)
Lanzarote rock grasshopper (Arminda lancerottensis)
Gomera rock grasshopper (Arminda latifrons)
Palma rock grasshopper (Arminda palmae)
East African sword grasshopper (Brachycrotaphus sjostedti)
Canarian pincer grasshopper (Calliptamus plebeius)
Tabora grasshopper (Catantops tanganus)
Cretan grasshopper (Chorthippus biroi)
Common field grasshopper (Chorthippus brunneus)
Piedmont grasshopper (Chorthippus cialancensis)
Morea grasshopper (Chorthippus moreanus)
Cephalonia grasshopper (Chorthippus sangiorgii)
Willemse's grasshopper (Chorthippus willemsei)
East African forest grasshopper (Coenona brevipedalis)
Eastern Arc forest grasshopper (Heteracris coerulipes)
Baccetti's apennine grasshopper (Italopodisma baccettii)
Costa's apennine grasshopper (Italopodisma costae)
Reatine apennine grasshopper (Italopodisma ebneri)
Canarian band-winged grasshopper (Oedipoda canariensis)
Cretan band-winged grasshopper (Oedipoda venusta)
Purpurarian grasshopper (Omocestus simonyi)
Cyprian maquis grasshopper (Pezotettix cypria)
Rhodes maquis grasshopper (Pezotettix lagoi)
Fuerteventura sand grasshopper (Sphingonotus fuerteventurae)
Lanzarote sand grasshopper (Sphingonotus pachecoi)
Red sand grasshopper (Sphingonotus sublaevis)
Cañadas sand grasshopper (Sphingonotus willemsei)
Apennine toothed grasshopper (Stenobothrus apenninus)

Tettigoniids
Species

Armoured katydid (Acanthoplus discoidalis)
Long-legged armoured katydid (Acanthoplus longipes)
Speiser's armoured katydid (Acanthoplus speiseri)
Antlered thorny katydid (Acanthoproctus cervinus)
Skeleton coast thorny katydid (Acanthoproctus diadematus)
Striped thorny katydid (Acanthoproctus vittatus)
Limpopo false shieldback (Acilacris obovatus)
Alfred's shieldback (Alfredectes semiaeneus)
Farrell's delicate katydid (Amyttacta farrelli)
Rentz's false shieldback (Aroegas rentzi)
East coast flat-necked shieldback (Arytropteris granulithorax)
Wood-louse glandular bush-cricket (Bradyporus oniscus)
Common ceresia (Ceresia pulchripes)
Eastern black-winged clonia (Clonia assimilis)
Namibian clonia (Clonia caudata)
Kalahari clonia (Clonia kalahariensis)
Giant black-winged clonia (Clonia melanoptera)
Small wavy clonia (Clonia minuta)
Saussure's black-winged clonia (Clonia saussurei)
Yellow-winged clonia (Clonia tessellata)
Van Son's wavy clonia (Clonia vansoni)
Common wavy clonia (Clonia vittata)
Wahlberg's clonia (Clonia wahlbergi)
Long-tailed meadow katydid (Conocephalus caudalis)
African cone-head (Conocephalus conocephalus)
Yellowtail meadow katydid (Conocephalus iris)
Elongate meadow katydid (Conocephalus longiceps)
Spotted meadow katydid (Conocephalus maculatus)
Common restio katydid (Conocephalus montana)
Northern armoured katydid (Enyaliopsis transvaalensis)
Epirus marbled bush-cricket (Eupholidoptera epirotica)
Cyclades marbled bush-cricket (Eupholidoptera kykladica)
Greek marbled bush-cricket (Eupholidoptera megastyla)
Short-winged spiny bush-cricket (Gampsocleis abbreviata)
Steppe spiny bush-cricket (Gampsocleis glabra)
Bachmann's armoured katydid (Hemihetrodes bachmanni)
Koringkriek (Hetrodes pupus)
Southern black-faced katydid (Lanista annulicornis)
Olympus meadow bush-cricket (Metrioptera tsirojanni)
Ebner's modest bush-cricket (Modestana ebneri)
Peringuey's ambush katydid (Peringueyella jocosa)
Spear reed katydid (Pseudorhynchus hastifer)
Sub-saharan reed katydid (Pseudorhynchus pungens)
Toothless bush-cricket (Rhacocleis edentata)
Greek bush-cricket (Rhacocleis graeca)
Cyclades bush-cricket (Rhacocleis insularis)
Robust conehead katydid (Ruspolia ampla)
Greek predatory bush-cricket (Saga hellenica)
Two-colored seedpod shieldback (Thoracistus viridifer)
Zulu shieldback (Zuludectes modestus)

Subspecies
Clonia wahlbergi wahlbergi
Lesser reed katydid (Pseudorhynchus pungens meridionalis)

Rhaphidophorids

Naoussa cave-cricket (Dolichopoda hussoni)
Aghias Andreas cave-cricket (Dolichopoda lustriae)
Makrykapa cave-cricket (Dolichopoda makrykapa)
Palpate cave cricket (Dolichopoda palpata)
Petalas cave-cricket (Dolichopoda patrizii)
Remy's cave-cricket (Dolichopoda remyi)
Katafygi cave-cricket (Dolichopoda unicolor)
Orchomenos cave-cricket (Dolichopoda vandeli)
Common cave-cricket (Troglophilus cavicola)
Lago's cave-cricket (Troglophilus lagoi)
Spiny cave-cricket (Troglophilus spinulosus)

Phaneropterids
Species

Elegant sylvan katydid (Acauloplax exigua)
Cretan long-legged bush-cricket (Acrometopa cretensis)
African mecopod (Anoedopoda lamellata)
Namibian black-kneed katydid (Aprosphylus hybridus)
Olszanowski's black-kneed katydid (Aprosphylus olszanowskii)
Giant leaf katydid (Arantia fasciata)
Cape flightless katydid (Austrodontura capensis)
Wilson's winter katydid (Brinckiella wilsoni)
Slender leaf katydid (Catoptropteryx aurita)
Corymeta (Corymeta amplectens)
Common bark katydid (Cymatomera denticollis)
Greater bark katydid (Cymatomerella spilophora)
Angolan ducetia (Ducetia sagitta)
Long-legged leaf katydid (Eulioptera flexilima)
Reticulated leaf katydid (Eulioptera reticulata)
Spined katydid (Eulioptera spinulosa)
Kalahari oblong-eyed katydid (Eurycorypha cereris)
Lesne's oblong-eyed katydid (Eurycorypha lesnei)
African oblong-eyed katydid (Eurycorypha meruensis)
Eastern oblong-eyed katydid (Eurycorypha proserpinae)
Cape agile katydid (Griffiniana capensis)
Long-winged agile katydid (Griffiniana longipes)
Dimorphic leaf katydid (Horatosphaga serrifera)
Namibian dimorphic leaf katydid (Horatosphaga stylifera)
Andreeva's plump bush-cricket (Isophya andreevae)
Bures' plump bush-cricket (Isophya bureschi)
Durmitor plump bush-cricket (Isophya clara)
Limnos plump bush-cricket (Isophya lemnotica)
Miksic's plump bush-cricket (Isophya miksici)
Blunt plump bush-cricket (Isophya obtusa)
Plevne plump bush-cricket (Isophya plevnensis)
Rhodope plump bush-cricket (Isophya rhodopensis)
Showy plump bush-cricket (Isophya speciosa)
Thrace plump bush-cricket (Isophya thracica)
Tosevsk's plump bush-cricket (Isophya tosevski)
Brunner's melidia (Melidia brunneri)
Greek ornate bush-cricket (Metaplastes oertzeni)
Balkan ornate bush-cricket (Metaplastes ornatus)
Flap-eared leaf katydid (Oxyecous lesnei)
Pelerinus rostratus
Arabian sickle bush-cricket (Phaneroptera sparsa)
Black-spotted plangia (Plangia compressa)
Krompokkel (Plangia graminea)
Aegean bright bush-cricket (Poecilimon aegaeus)
Balkan bright bush-cricket (Poecilimon affinis)
Lost bright bush-cricket (Poecilimon amissus)
Enlarged bright bush-cricket (Poecilimon ampliatus)
Pelopponesian bright bush-cricket (Poecilimon artedentatus)
Cretan bright bush-cricket (Poecilimon cretensis)
Dodecanese bright bush-cricket (Poecilimon deplanatus)
Ebner's bright bush-cricket (Poecilimon ebneri)
Ege bright bush-cricket (Poecilimon ege)
Erimanthos bright bush-cricket (Poecilimon erimanthos)
Gerlind's bright bush-cricket (Poecilimon gerlindae)
Slender bright bush-cricket (Poecilimon gracilis)
Hooked bright bush-cricket (Poecilimon hamatus)
Heroic bright bush-cricket (Poecilimon heroicus)
Macedonian bright bush-cricket (Poecilimon hoelzeli)
Marianne's bright bush-cricket (Poecilimon mariannae)
Noble bright bush-cricket (Poecilimon nobilis)
Obese bright bush-cricket (Poecilimon obesus)
Orbelicos bright bush-cricket (Poecilimon orbelicus)
Similar bright bush-cricket (Poecilimon propinquus)
Saint-paul's bright bush-cricket (Poecilimon sanctipauli)
Poecilimon thessalicus
Single-spined bright bush-cricket (Poecilimon unispinosus)
Veluchi bright bush-cricket (Poecilimon veluchianus)
Werner's bright bush-cricket (Poecilimon werneri)
Zimmer's bright bush-cricket (Poecilimon zimmeri)
Kalahari dimorphic leaf katydid (Prosphaga calaharica)
Lace-winged katydid (Pseudosaga maculata)
Acacia katydid (Terpnistria lobulata)
Zebra katydid (Terpnistria zebrata)
Striped grass katydid (Tylopsis bilineolata)
Common grass katydid (Tylopsis continua)
Elongate grass katydid (Tylopsis rubrescens)
Blue-legged sylvan katydid (Zabalius ophthalmicus)
Tsitsikamma katydid (Zitsikama tessellata)

Subspecies

Eulioptera reticulata leptomorpha
Eulioptera reticulata reticulata
Isophya longicaudata adamovici
Isophya rhodopensis leonorae

Other Orthoptera species

African sandhopper (Afrotridactylus usambaricus)
Seychelles monkey grasshopper (Euschmidtia cruciformis)
Swahili monkey grasshopper (Euschmidtia sansibarica)
Krimbas' mole-cricket (Gryllotalpa krimbasi)
Niphetogryllacris fryeri
Prosopogryllacris sechellensis
Cyprian stick grasshopper (Pyrgomorpha cypria)

Hymenoptera
There are 106 species in the order Hymenoptera assessed as least concern.

Ants
Leptothorax recedens

Colletids

Colletes hederae
Colletes pannonicus
Colletes schmidi
Colletes tuberculiger
Hylaeus ater

Melittids

Dasypoda morotei
Dasypoda pyriformis
Macropis europaea

Apids

Amegilla canifrons
Anthophora alluaudi
White shouldered bumble bee (Bombus appositus)
Black and gold bumble bee (Bombus auricomus)
Bombus baeri
Two form bumble bee (Bombus bifarius)
Two-spotted bumble bee (Bombus bimaculatus)
Northern amber bumble bee (Bombus borealis)
Central bumble bee (Bombus centralis)
Lemon cuckoo bumblebee (Bombus citrinus)
Bombus coccineus
Bombus ephippiatus
Yellowhead bumblebee (Bombus flavifrons)
Frigid bumblebee (Bombus frigidus)
Bombus funebris
Brown-belted bumblebee (Bombus griseocollis)
Bombus handlirschi
Hunt bumble bee (Bombus huntii)
Common eastern bumblebee (Bombus impatiens)
Indiscriminate cuckoo bumble bee (Bombus insularis)
Bombus lapponicus
Bombus macgregori
Bombus magnus
Black-tailed bumblebee (Bombus melanopygus)
Fuzzy-horned bumble bee (Bombus mixtus)
Bombus morio
Nevada bumble bee (Bombus nevadensis)
Bombus opifex
Bombus pauloensis (= Bombus atratus)
Bombus perezi
Bombus pereziellus
Confusing bumblebee (Bombus perplexus)
Bombus pyrenaeus
Red-belted bumble bee (Bombus rufocinctus)
Sanderson bumble bee (Bombus sandersoni)
Sitka bumblebee (Bombus sitkensis)
Forest bumble bee (Bombus sylvicola)
Bombus ternarius
Bombus transversalis
Bombus trinominatus
Half-black bumblebee (Bombus vagans)
Van Dyke bumble bee (Bombus vandykei)
Yellow-faced bumblebee (Bombus vosnesenskii)
Bombus weisi
Ceratina gravidula
Epeolus alpinus
Epeolus fallax
Nomada atroscutellaris
Nomada bluethgeni
Nomada concolor
Nomada coronata
Nomada discedens
Nomada fabriciana
Nomada ferruginata
Nomada flava
Nomada fusca
Nomada hirtipes
Nomada melathoracica
Nomada merceti
Nomada piccioliana
Nomada priesneri
Nomada signata
Nomada similis

Halictids

Dufourea alpina
Halictus concinnus
Halictus frontalis
Halictus langobardicus
Lasioglossum alpigenum
Lasioglossum arctifrons
Lasioglossum bavaricum
Lasioglossum chalcodes
Lasioglossum laetum
Lasioglossum viride
Lasioglossum wollastoni

Andrenids

Andrena anthrisci
Andrena concinna
Andrena leucolippa
Andrena maderensis
Andrena nuptialis
Andrena rogenhoferi
Andrena strohmella
Andrena wollastoni
Flavipanurgus flavus
Flavipanurgus ibericus
Flavipanurgus venustus
Panurgus canescens
Panurgus dentipes
Panurgus meridionalis

Megachilids

Hoplitis lepeletieri
Hoplitis loti
Hoplitis ochraceicornis
Hoplitis ravouxi
Hoplitis villosa
Megachile lagopoda
Megachile parietina
Osmia alticola
Osmia pilicornis

Mantises

Wingless mantis (Apteromantis aptera)
Devil's flower mantis (Blepharopsis mendica)
Sublime conehead mantis (Hypsicorypha gracilis)
European mantis (Mantis religiosa)
Seychelles mantis (Polyspilota seychelliana)

Lepidoptera
Lepidoptera comprises moths and butterflies. There are 420 species and one subspecies in the order Lepidoptera assessed as least concern.

Swallowtail butterflies

Chinese three-tailed swallowtail (Bhutanitis thaidina)
Yellow zebra (Graphium deucalion)
Tabitha's swordtail (Graphium dorcus)
Meyer's triangle (Graphium meyeri)
Dancing swallowtail (Graphium polistratus)
Tabora white lady (Graphium taboranus)
Paradise birdwing (Ornithoptera paradisea)
Papilio acheron
Common white-banded swallowtail (Papilio cyproeofila)
White-banded swallowtail (Papilio echerioides)
Corsican swallowtail (Papilio hospiton)
Papilio toboroi
Papilio weymeri
Cretan festoon (Zerynthia cretica)

Lycaenids

Braine's zulu (Alaena brainei)
Barkly's copper (Aloeides barklyi)
Red Hill copper (Aloeides egerides)
Nolloth's copper (Aloeides nollothi)
Acacia blue (Amblypodia vivarna)
Ancema anysis
Ancema ctesia
Arnold's ciliate blue (Anthene arnoldi)
Red forewing (Anthene fulvus)
Anomalous ciliate blue (Anthene juba)
Kersten's ciliate blue (Anthene kersteni)
Large red spot ciliate blue (Anthene lusones)
Anthene opalina
Trimen's ciliate blue (Anthene otacilia)
Pitman's ciliate blue (Anthene pitmani)
Allard's silver-line (Apharitis allardi)
Saharan silverline (Apharitis nilus)
Common silver-line (Apharitis siphax)
Rare silver-spot (Aphnaeus argyrocyclus)
Crowned highflier (Aphnaeus coronae)
Arhopala agesias
Bushblue (Arhopala anthelus)
Arhopala argentea
Tamil oakblue (Arhopala bazaloides)
Arhopala cleander
Arhopala similis
Spanish argus (Aricia morronensis)
Green flash (Artipe eryx)
Aslauga latifurca
Prouvost's aslauga (Aslauga prouvosti)
White-banded babul blue (Azanus isis)
Hildegard's buff (Baliochila hildegarda)
Lannin's buff (Baliochila singularis)
Bullis stigmata
Alternative bush blue (Cacyreus virilis)
Angled pierrot (Caleta caleta)
Orange-banded protea butterfly (Capys alphaeus)
Castalius fasciatus
Crowley's epitola (Cerautola crowleyi)
Common imperial (Cheritra freja)
Beulah's opal (Chrysoritis beulah)
Citrinophila unipunctata
Crudaria capensis
Lorquin's blue (Cupido lorquinii)
Drupadia cindi
Drupadia estella
Purple giant epitola (Epitola urania)
Western pearly (Eresiomera bicolor)
Cookson's buff (Euthecta cooksoni)
Western marble (Falcuna leonensis)
Good's epitola (Geritola goodii)
Paphos blue (Glaucopsyche paphos)
Equatorial mountain blue (Harpendyreus aequatorialis)
Congo tiger blue (Hewitsonia congoensis)
Hypochrysops chrysargyra
Diggles blue (Hypochrysops digglesi)
Fiery jewel (Hypochrysops ignita)
Hypolycaena auricostalis
Shining fairy hairstreak (Hypolycaena coerulea)
Black fairy hairstreak (Hypolycaena nigra)
Hypophytala reducta
Blotched sapphire (Iolaus creta)
Yellow-banded sapphire (Iolaus diametra)
Iolaus hemicyanus
Iasis sapphire (Iolaus iasis)
Ituri sapphire (Iolaus iturensis)
Emerald sapphire (Iolaus laonides)
Parallel sapphire (Iolaus paneperata)
Dark jewel sapphire (Iolaus sciophilus)
Nigerian sapphire gem (Iridana nigeriana)
Jamides caerulea
Druce's large woolly legs (Lachnocnema luna)
Lachnocnema sosia
Spanish purple hairstreak (Laeosopis roboris)
Cream pierid blue (Larinopoda lircaea)
Badham's blue (Lepidochrysops badhami)
Barnes' blue (Lepidochrysops barnesi)
Kitale giant cupid (Lepidochrysops kitale)
Lesotho blue (Lepidochrysops lerothodi)
Quickelberge's blue (Lepidochrysops quickelbergei)
Leptomyrina boschi
Cape black-eye (Leptomyrina lara)
Canary blue (Leptotes webbianus)
Lipaphnaeus loxura
Modest false dots (Liptena modesta)
Liptena praestans
Liptena turbata
Yellow liptena (Liptena xanthostola)
Iberian sooty copper (Lycaena bleusei)
Eastern harvester (Megalopalpus simplex)
Common dots (Micropentila adelgitha)
Micropentila ugandae
Common acraea mimic (Mimacraea darwinia)
Maessen's acraea mimic (Mimacraea maesseni)
Mimacraea skoptoles
Sharpe's fig tree blue (Myrina sharpei)
Nacaduba sanaya
Neoepitola barombiensis
White imperial butterfly (Neomyrina nivea)
Mimic liptena (Obania subvariegata)
Liberian ginger white (Oboronia liberiana)
Light ginger white (Oboronia pseudopunctatus)
Ornipholidotos congoensis
Ornipholidotos etoumbi
Ornipholidotos gemina
Ornipholidotos nbeti
Large glasswing (Ornipholidotos peucetia)
Common false head (Oxylides faunus)
Paradeudorix eleala
Western cream pentila (Pentila picena)
Cator's fairy playboy (Pilodeudorix catori)
Dark round-spot (Pilodeudorix leonina)
Sombre diopetes (Pilodeudorix pseudoderitas)
Bellier's blue (Plebejus bellieri)
Glandon blue (Plebejus glandon)
Spanish zephyr blue (Plebejus hespericus)
Cretan argus (Plebejus psyloritus)
Gavarnie blue (Plebejus pyrenaicus)
Spanish chalkhill blue (Polyommatus albicans)
Grecian anomalous blue (Polyommatus aroaniensis)
Azure chalkhill blue (Polyommatus caelestissimus)
Chalkhill blue (Polyommatus coridon)
Furry blue (Polyommatus dolus)
Oberthür's anomalous blue (Polyommatus fabressei)
Catalan furry blue (Polyommatus fulgens)
Provence chalkhill blue (Polyommatus hispanus)
Spotted adonis blue (Polyommatus punctiferus)
Andalusian anomalous blue (Polyommatus violetae)
Pseudaletis camarensis
Pseudaletis dolieri
Pseudodipsas cephenes
Baton blue (Pseudophilotes baton)
Rapala rhodopis
Spindasis kutu
Taveta silverline (Spindasis tavetensis)
Stempfferia badura
Carpenter's sapphire (Stugeta carpenteri)
Red imperial (Suasa lisides)
Boniface's false head (Syrmoptera bonifacei)
Le Gras' pierrot (Tarucus legrasi)
Western telipna (Telipna semirufa)
Thaumaina uranothauma
Thermoniphas distincta
Brauns' skolly (Thestor braunsi)
Moroccan hairstreak (Tomares mauretanicus)
Larsen's glasswing (Torbenia larseni)
White pierrot (Tuxentius calice)
Forest pied pierrot (Tuxentius carana)
Mountain pierrot (Tuxentius margaritaceus)
Una usta
Antinori's branded blue (Uranothauma antinorii)
Uranothauma cordatus
Uranothauma delatorum
Dark grass blue (Zizina antanossa)

Nymphalids

Sardinian small tortoiseshell (Aglais ichnusa)
Chief (Amauris echeria)
Apatura parisatis
Bebearia ikelemba
Laetitia forester (Bebearia laetitia)
Maligned forester (Bebearia maledicta)
Fantasiella (Bebearia phantasiella)
Bebearia severini
Squinting bush-brown (Bicyclus anynana)
Small stately bush-brown (Bicyclus evadne)
Jeffery's bush-brown (Bicyclus jefferyi)
Black bush-brown (Bicyclus martius)
Lesser rock bush-brown (Bicyclus milyas)
Smith's bush-brown (Bicyclus smithi)
Fox's blue-banded bush-brown (Bicyclus sweadneri)
Oberthür's pathfinder (Catuna oberthueri)
Cethosia obscura
Montane charaxes (Charaxes alpinus)
Bocquet's demon charaxes (Charaxes bocqueti)
Green-veined charaxes (Charaxes candiope)
Silver demon charaxes (Charaxes catachrous)
Demon charaxes (Charaxes etheocles)
Charaxes fionae
Charaxes grahamei
Blue-spangled charaxes (Charaxes guderiana)
Imperial blue charaxes (Charaxes imperialis)
Charaxes phoebus
Southern hermit (Chazara prieuri)
Chersonesia excellens
Chersonesia intermedia
Cirrochroa regina
Moroccan pearly heath (Coenonympha arcanioides)
Corsican heath (Coenonympha corinna)
Moroccan dusky heath (Coenonympha fettigii)
Alpine heath (Coenonympha gardetta)
Eastern large heath (Coenonympha rhodopensis)
Cretan small heath (Coenonympha thyrsis)
Cymothoe caenis
Cream glider (Cymothoe consanguis)
Cymothoe eris
Cymothoe haynae
Weymer's glider (Cymothoe weymeri)
Zenker's glider (Cymothoe zenkeri)
Straight line mapwing (Cyrestis nivea)
Little mapwing (Cyrestis themire)
False Mnestra ringlet (Erebia aethiopella)
Almond-eyed ringlet (Erebia alberganus)
Lorkovic's brassy ringlet (Erebia calcaria)
Common brassy ringlet (Erebia cassioides)
Small mountain ringlet (Erebia epiphron)
Eriphyle ringlet (Erebia eriphyle)
Silky ringlet (Erebia gorge)
Gavarnie ringlet (Erebia gorgone)
Spanish brassy ringlet (Erebia hispania)
Lefèbvre's ringlet (Erebia lefebvrei)
Yellow-spotted ringlet (Erebia manto)
Lesser mountain ringlet (Erebia melampus)
Black ringlet (Erebia melas)
Piedmont ringlet (Erebia meolans)
Mnestra's ringlet (Erebia mnestra)
Marbled ringlet (Erebia montana)
Autumn ringlet (Erebia neoridas)
De Lesse's brassy ringlet (Erebia nivalis)
Bright eyed ringlet (Erebia oeme)
Bulgarian ringlet (Erebia orientalis)
Chapman's ringlet (Erebia palarica)
Blind ringlet (Erebia pharte)
Sooty ringlet (Erebia pluto)
Water ringlet (Erebia pronoe)
Nicholl's ringlet (Erebia rhodopensis)
Pyrenees brassy ringlet (Erebia rondoui)
Larche ringlet (Erebia scipio)
False dewy ringlet (Erebia sthennyo)
Styrian ringlet (Erebia stiria)
Stygian ringlet (Erebia styx)
De Prunner's ringlet (Erebia triaria)
Swiss brassy ringlet (Erebia tyndarus)
Zapater's ringlet (Erebia zapateri)
Erites elegans
Eyed cyclops (Erites medura)
Euphaedra abri
Crosse's forester (Euphaedra crossei)
Brown Ceres forester (Euphaedra delera)
Western blue-banded forester (Euphaedra eupalus)
Dark brown forester (Euphaedra losinga)
Modest themis forester (Euphaedra modesta)
Pear-banded forester (Euphaedra piriformis)
Simple orange forester (Euphaedra simplex)
Splendid themis forester (Euphaedra splendens)
Themis forester (Euphaedra themis)
Cynthia's fritillary (Euphydryas cynthia)
Sulawesi striped blue crow (Euploea configurata)
Euploea core
Seram crow (Euploea dentiplaga)
Pagenstecher's crow (Euploea doretta)
Bismark crow (Euploea eboraci)
Sulawesi pied crow (Euploea eupator)
Weymer's crow (Euploea latifasciata)
Western euptera (Euptera dorothea)
Ducarme's euptera (Euptera ducarmei)
Ituri euptera (Euptera ituriensis)
Loma nymph (Euriphene lomaensis)
Oban nymph (Euriphene obani)
Mottled green nymph (Euryphura achlys)
Euthalia dirtea
Euthalia djata
Euthalia malaccana
White tipped baron (Euthalia merta)
Fabriciana auresiana
Corsican fritillary (Fabriciana elisa)
Angular glider (Harma theobene)
Common brown (Heteronympha merope)
Eyed bush brown (Heteropsis perspicua)
Mountain grayling (Hipparchia algirica)
Southern grayling (Hipparchia aristaeus)
Azores grayling (Hipparchia azorina)
Sicilian grayling (Hipparchia blachieri)
Moroccan rock grayling (Hipparchia caroli)
Cretan grayling (Hipparchia cretica)
Cyprus grayling (Hipparchia cypriensis)
Gomera grayling (Hipparchia gomera)
Austaut's grayling (Hipparchia hansii)
Madeira grayling (Hipparchia maderensis)
Samos grayling (Hipparchia mersina)
Le Cerf's grayling (Hipparchia miguelensis)
Italian grayling (Hipparchia neapolitana)
Corsican grayling (Hipparchia neomiris)
Powell's grayling (Hipparchia powelli)
Grayling (Hipparchia semele)
Tree grayling (Hipparchia statilinus)
Gran Canaria grayling (Hipparchia tamadabae)
Delattin's grayling (Hipparchia volgensis)
Canary grayling (Hipparchia wyssii)
Côte d'Ivoire eggfly (Hypolimnas aubergeri)
Moroccan meadow brown (Hyponephele maroccana)
Seram small tree-nymph (Ideopsis klassika)
Ideopsis vulgaris
Peacock pansy (Junonia almana)
Yellow pansy (Junonia hierta)
Dark blue pansy (Junonia oenone)
Naval pansy (Junonia touhilimasa)
Pale wall brown (Lasiommata paramegaera)
Lasippa neriphus
Cyprus meadow brown (Maniola cypricola)
Turkish meadow brown (Maniola megala)
Sardinian meadow brown (Maniola nurag)
Italian marbled white (Melanargia arge)
Iberian marbled white (Melanargia lachesis)
Moroccan marbled white (Melanargia lucasi)
Sicilian marbled white (Melanargia pherusa)
Levantine marbled white (Melanargia titea)
Aetherie fritillary (Melitaea aetherie)
Little fritillary (Melitaea asteria)
Meadow fritillary (Melitaea parthenoides)
Algerian fritillary (Melitaea punica)
Grisons fritillary (Melitaea varia)
Moore's bushbrown (Mycalesis heri)
Itys bush brown (Mycalesis itys)
Common bush brown (Mycalesis janardana)
Mycalesis lorna
Barred false sailor (Neptidopsis fulgurata)
Scalloped false sailor (Neptidopsis ophione)
Celebes sailer (Neptis celebica)
Original club sailer (Neptis melicerta)
Clubbed sailer (Neptis nicoteles)
Mountain sailer (Neptis occidentalis)
Angled petty sailer (Neptis quintilla)
Alpine grayling (Oeneis glacialis)
Violet-banded palla (Palla violinitens)
Crowley's tiger (Parantica crowleyi)
Morishita's tiger (Parantica hypowattan)
Kirby's tiger (Parantica kirbyi)
Manado yellow tiger (Parantica menadensis)
Least tiger (Parantica pumila)
Fat tiger (Parantica rotundata)
Weiske's tiger (Parantica weiskei)
Canary speckled wood (Pararge xiphioides)
Spotted-eye brown (Paternympha narycia)
Toothed commodore (Precis frobeniusi)
Gaudy commodore (Precis octavia)
Montane commodore (Precis rauana)
Glorious begum (Prothoe calydonia)
Clouded mother-of-pearl (Protogoniomorpha anacardii)
Martin's false sergeant (Pseudathyma martini)
Pseudathyma plutonica
Moroccan grayling (Pseudochazara atlantis)
Grecian grayling (Pseudochazara graeca)
Lydian tawny rockbrown (Pseudochazara lydia)
Nevada grayling (Pseudochazara williamsi)
Black Satyr (Satyrus actaea)
Satyrus virbius
Velvet tree nymph (Sevenia occidentalium)
Ochreous tree nymph (Sevenia umbrina)
Robertson's brown (Stygionympha robertsoni)
Symbrenthia hippalus
Symbrenthia hypatia
Taenaris horsfieldii
Malay viscount (Tanaecia pelea)
Spring widow (Tarsocera cassus)
Dark jungle glory (Thaumantis noureddin)
Scarce blue tiger (Tirumala gautama)
Vanessa vulcania

Skippers
Species

Southern marbled skipper (Carcharodus boeticus)
False mallow skipper (Carcharodus tripolinus)
Alpine grizzled skipper (Pyrgus andromedae)
Foulquier's grizzled skipper (Pyrgus bellieri)
Dusky grizzled skipper (Pyrgus cacaliae)
Carline skipper (Pyrgus carlinae)
Southern grizzled skipper (Pyrgus malvoides)
Warren's skipper (Pyrgus warrenensis)
Corsican red-underwing skipper (Spialia therapne)
Thymelicus christi
Moroccan small skipper (Thymelicus hamza)

Subspecies
Oreisplanus munionga larana

Pierids

Anthocharis belia
Provence orange-tip (Anthocharis euphenoides)
Socotran caper white (Belenois anomala)
Calypso caper white (Belenois calypso)
Raffray's white (Belenois raffrayi)
Red-edged white (Belenois rubrosignata)
Central caper white (Belenois theuszi)
Banded gold tip (Colotis eris)
Purple tip (Colotis ione)
Yellow splendour (Colotis protomedia)
Delias enniana
Delias luctuosa
Delias periboea
Rosenberg's painted jezebel (Delias rosenbergi)
Spotless black-veined small white (Dixeia leucophanes)
Spanish greenish black-tip (Euchloe bazae)
Euchloe eversi
Euchloe grancanariensis
Canary green-striped white (Euchloe hesperidum)
Corsican dappled white (Euchloe insularis)
Mountain dappled white (Euchloe simplonia)
Eurema alitha
One-spot yellow grass (Eurema andersoni)
Small grass yellow (Eurema brigitta)
Eurema tominia
Real's wood white (Leptidea reali)
Asphodel dotted border (Mylothris asphodelus)
Mylothris continua
Talbot's dotted border (Mylothris talboti)
Balkan green-veined white (Pieris balcana)
Ethiopian cabbage white (Pieris brassicoides)
Bath white (Pontia daplidice)

Riodinids

Delicate judy (Abisara delicata)
Abisara geza
Scalloped judy (Abisara rutherfordii)
Dodona eugenes
Laxita teneta
Malay red harliquin (Paralaxita damajanti)
Paralaxita orphna

Beetles
There are 423 beetle species assessed as least concern.

Geotrupids

Geotrupes douei
Geotrupes ibericus
Thorectes armifrons
Thorectes escorialensis
Thorectes geminatus
Thorectes intermedius
Thorectes laevigatus
Thorectes nitidus
Thorectes rugatulus
Typhaeus typhaeoides

Longhorn beetles

Brachypteroma ottomanum
Callimus abdominalis
Chlorophorus glabromaculatus
Chlorophorus ruficornis
Clytus lama
Clytus tropicus
Monochamus sartor
Ropalopus femoratus

Click beetles

Ampedus aethiops
Ampedus apicalis
Ampedus auripes
Ampedus ochrinulus
Ampedus triangulum
Stenagostus rufus

Eucnemids

Hylis cariniceps
Hylis procerulus
Isoriphis marmottani
Microrhagus emyi
Microrhagus lepidus
Microrhagus pygmaeus
Xylophilus corticalis

Scarabaeids

Accrosus carpetanus
Accrosus siculus
Accrosus tingitanus
Agoliinus ragusae
Agrilinus ibericus
Allogymnopleurus chloris
Allogymnopleurus thalassinus
Amidorus cribricollis
Amidorus moraguesi
Ammoecius dentatus
Ammoecius elevatus
Ammoecius franzi
Ammoecius frigidus
Amphistomus complanatus
Amphistomus speculifer
Anomiopus bonariensis
Anomiopus nigrocoeruleus
Anomiopus parallelus
Anomiopus smaragdinus
Anomiopus virescens
Anomius annamariae
Anomius baeticus
Anomius castaneus
Anomius segonzaci
Aphodius algiricus
Aphodius ghardimaouensis
Aphodius orbignyi
Aptenocanthon hopsoni
Aptenocanthon winyar
Ateuchetus laticollis
Ateuchetus puncticollis
Ateuchetus variolosus
Ateuchus carbonarius
Ateuchus latus
Ateuchus murrayi
Ateuchus puncticolle
Aulacopris reichei
Bdelyrus howdeni
Besourenga horacioi
Biralus mahunkaorum
Bodilus barbarus
Bodilus beduinus
Bodilus longispina
Boletoscapter furcatus
Bubas bison
Bubas bubaloides
Bubas bubalus
Caccobius cavatus
Caccobius ferrugineus
Caccobius nigritulus
Calamosternus hyxos
Calamosternus mayeri
Canthidium bicolor
Canthidium bokermanni
Canthidium cavifrons
Canthidium femoratum
Canthidium guyanense
Canthidium latum
Canthidium manni
Canthidium sladeni
Canthidium viride
Canthochilum anacaona
Canthon angularis
Canthon daguerrei
Canthon deplanatus
Canthon edentulus
Canthon heyrovskyi
Canthon janthinus
Canthon laminatus
Canthon lituratus
Canthon lividus
Canthon luctuosus
Canthon lunatus
Canthon mutabilis
Canthon orfilai
Canthon ornatus
Canthon podagricus
Canthon quinquemaculatus
Canthon rubrescens
Canthon rutilans
Canthon septemmaculatus
Canthon smaragdulus
Canthon sordidus
Canthon subhyalinus
Canthon tetraodon
Canthon triangularis
Canthon unicolor
Canthon virens
Catharsius calaharicus
Catharsius chinai
Catharsius oedipus
Catharsius pandion
Cephalodesmius armiger
Cephalodesmius laticollis
Cheironitis audens
Cheironitis furcifer
Cheironitis scabrosus
Chilothorax albosetosus
Chilothorax exclamationis
Chilothorax hieroglyphicus
Chilothorax lineolatus
Chilothorax naevuliger
Chittius anatolicus
Copris armiger
Copris fallaciosus
Copris fidius
Copris inhalatus
Copris pueli
Copris umbilicatus
Coprophanaeus corythus
Coprophanaeus gamezi
Coprophanaeus ohausi
Coprophanaeus pertyi
Coptodactyla lesnei
Coptodactyla nitida
Coptodactyla storeyi
Cryptocanthon andersoni
Cryptocanthon campbellorum
Cyptochirus ambiguus
Deltochilum batesi
Deltochilum brasiliense
Deltochilum carinatum
Deltochilum guyanense
Deltochilum icarus
Deltochilum peruanum
Deltochilum rubripenne
Demarziella imitatrix
Diastellopalpus infernalis
Dichotomius apicalis
Dichotomius calcaratus
Dichotomius crinicollis
Dichotomius glaucus
Dichotomius nimuendaju
Dichotomius planicollis
Dichotomius podalirius
Dichotomius prietoi
Dichotomius punctulatipennis
Dichotomius tristis
Dichotomius worontzowi
Dicranocara deschodti
Diorygopyx niger
Eodrepanus fastiditus
Eodrepanus parallelus
Epirinus gratus
Epirinus validus
Esymus helenaeliviae
Esymus sesquivittatus
Euheptaulacus atlantis
Euoniticellus inaequalis
Euoniticellus kawanus
Euoniticellus nasicornis
Euonthophagus crocatus
Euonthophagus tissoni
Euorodalus tersus
Frankenbergerius armatus
Garreta azureus
Garreta malleolus
Garreta nitens
Gromphas aeruginosa
Gromphas amazonica
Gymnopleurus aenescens
Gymnopleurus andreaei
Gymnopleurus humanus
Gymnopleurus reichei
Gymnopleurus virens
Gyronotus pumilus
Hansreia affinis
Heliocopris faunus
Heliocopris japetus
Heptaulacus rasettii
Heteronitis castelnaui
Homocopris torulosus
Isocopris tarsalis
Latodrepanus laticollis
Lepanus bidentatus
Lepanus politus
Lepanus pygmaeus
Lepanus ustulatus
Lepanus villosus
Liatongus arrowi
Malagoniella argentina
Malagoniella chalybaea
Mecynodes leucopterus
Mecynodes striatulus
Melinopterus dellacasai
Melinopterus stolzi
Melinopterus tingens
Melinopterus villarreali
Mendidaphodius paganettii
Metacatharsius inermis
Metacatharsius pumilioniformis
Monoplistes occidentalis
Monoplistes phanophilus
Monoplistes tropicus
Neosisyphus fortuitus
Neosisyphus macrorubrus
Neosisyphus mirabilis
Neosisyphus rubrus
Nimbus franzinii
Nimbus richardi
Odontoloma endroedyi
Odontoloma louwi
Odontoloma pygidiale
Onitis aerarius
Onitis belial
Onitis caffer
Onitis fulgidus
Onitis granulisetosus
Onitis ion
Onitis laminosus
Onitis mendax
Onitis obscurus
Onitis robustus
Onitis uncinatus
Ontherus aequatorius
Ontherus azteca
Ontherus brevicollis
Ontherus dentatus
Ontherus erosioides
Ontherus laminifer
Ontherus obliquus
Ontherus raptor
Ontherus virescens
Onthophagus aequepubens
Onthophagus aethiopicus
Onthophagus anchommatus
Onthophagus andalusicus
Onthophagus anisocerus
Onthophagus asper
Onthophagus atricapillus
Onthophagus atrofasciatus
Onthophagus atrox
Onthophagus australis
Onthophagus beiranus
Onthophagus bicornis
Onthophagus binyana
Onthophagus bornemisszai
Onthophagus bubalus
Onthophagus bunamin
Onthophagus capelliformis
Onthophagus chepara
Onthophagus cyaneoniger
Onthophagus dellacasai
Onthophagus depressus
Onthophagus falzonii
Onthophagus flavolimbatus
Onthophagus fritschi
Onthophagus fuscivestis
Onthophagus giraffa
Onthophagus granulatus
Onthophagus gulmarri
Onthophagus hermonensis
Onthophagus hirtus
Onthophagus hoplocerus
Onthophagus humpatensis
Onthophagus impressicollis
Onthophagus janthinus
Onthophagus jugicola
Onthophagus juvencus
Onthophagus kavirondus
Onthophagus lacustris
Onthophagus laminatus
Onthophagus latigena
Onthophagus leanus
Onthophagus lemekensis
Onthophagus lugubris
Onthophagus mamillatus
Onthophagus manya
Onthophagus melitaeus
Onthophagus muelleri
Onthophagus mundill
Onthophagus muticus
Onthophagus neostenocerus
Onthophagus nigellus
Onthophagus nigriventris
Onthophagus obtusicornis
Onthophagus onorei
Onthophagus opacicollis
Onthophagus panici
Onthophagus parallelicornis
Onthophagus parumnotatus
Onthophagus petrovitzianus
Onthophagus probus
Onthophagus propinquus
Onthophagus pugionatus
Onthophagus punctatus
Onthophagus punthari
Onthophagus quadricuspis
Onthophagus queenslandicus
Onthophagus rufosignatus
Onthophagus semimetallicus
Onthophagus sericatus
Onthophagus stigmosus
Onthophagus stylocerus
Onthophagus subocelliger
Onthophagus tamworthi
Onthophagus tenebrosus
Onthophagus trapezicornis
Onthophagus tweedensis
Onthophagus victoriensis
Onthophagus vigens
Onthophagus weringerong
Onthophagus xanthomerus
Onthophagus yaran
Onthophagus yungaburra
Oxysternon macleayi
Pachysoma denticollis
Pachysoma fitzsimonsi
Pachysoma gariepinus
Pachysoma hippocrates
Paracanthon trichonotulus
Pedaria biseria
Pedaria conformis
Pedaria criberrima
Pedaria decorsei
Pedaria dentata
Pedaria durandi
Pedaria estellae
Pedaria juhellegrandi
Pedaria puncticollis
Pedaria tenebrosa
Phalacronothus putoni
Phanaeus bispinus
Phanaeus prasinus
Phanaeus pyrois
Phanaeus sororibispinus
Plagiogonus esimoides
Plagiogonus nanus
Proagoderus atriclaviger
Proagoderus bicallosus
Proagoderus extensus
Proagoderus quadrituber
Proagoderus sapphirinus
Pseudacrossus suffertus
Sauvagesinella palustris
Scarabaeus aegyptiorum
Scarabaeus ambiguus
Scarabaeus costatus
Scarabaeus damarensis
Scarabaeus deludens
Scarabaeus difficilis
Scarabaeus galenus
Scarabaeus inoportunus
Scarabaeus karrooensis
Scarabaeus laevistriatus
Scarabaeus namibicus
Scarabaeus nigroaeneus
Scarabaeus subaeneus
Scatimus simulator
Scatonomus viridis
Scybalocanthon nigriceps
Scybalocanthon sexspilotus
Scybalocanthon trimaculatus
Scybalophagus patagonicus
Scybalophagus plicatipennis
Scybalophagus rugosus
Sisyphus caffer
Sisyphus fasciculatus
Sisyphus natalensis
Sisyphus ocellatus
Subrinus vitellinus
Sulcophanaeus auricollis
Sulcophanaeus batesi
Sulcophanaeus imperator
Sulcophanaeus miyashitai
Sylvicanthon bridarollii
Temnoplectron bornemisszai
Temnoplectron boucomonti
Temnoplectron cooki
Temnoplectron disruptum
Temnoplectron finnigani
Temnoplectron rotundum
Temnoplectron subvolitans
Tomogonus crassus
Trichillidium quadridens
Uroxys coarctatus
Uroxys dilaticollis
Uroxys elongatus
Uroxys variabilis
Xinidium davisi

Other beetle species

Allopentarthrum elumbe
Dacne notata
Dorcus musimon
Dryotribus mimeticus
Grynocharis oblonga
Lucanus barbarossa
Lucanus tetraodon
Macrancylus linearis
Platycerus spinifer
Scobicia barbifrons
Scobicia ficicola
Tritoma bipustulata

Odonata
Odonata includes dragonflies and damselflies. There are 1690 species and five subspecies in the order Odonata assessed as least concern.

Platystictids

Drepanosticta anascephala
Drepanosticta carmichaeli
Palaemnema abbreviata
Palaemnema brucelli
Elongate shadowdamsel (Palaemnema gigantula)
Palaemnema joanetta
Palaemnema melanura
Palaemnema nathalia
Cordoba shadowdamsel (Palaemnema paulicoba)
Palaemnema paulina
Palaemnema paulitaba
Palaemnema picicaudata
Short-winged shadowdamsel (Protosticta beaumonti)
Protosticta curiosa
Protosticta davenporti
Protosticta geijskesi
Protosticta grandis
Protosticta gravelyi
Protosticta linnaei
Protosticta medusa
Protosticta rufostigma
Protosticta taipokauensis
Sinosticta debra
Sinosticta ogatai

Chlorogomphids

Chlorogomphus arooni
Chlorogomphus campioni
Chlorogomphus iriomotensis
Chlorogomphus papilio
Watanabeopetalia atkinsoni

Argiolestids

Little flatwing (Argiolestes pusillus)
Powdered flatwing (Austroargiolestes calcaris)
Caledopteryx maculata
Caledopteryx sarasini
Neurolestes trinervis
Podolestes orientalis
Trineuragrion percostale

Perilestids

Attenuate twigtail (Perilestes attenuatus)
Perilestes kahli
Perilestes solutus
Perissolestes cornutus
Perissolestes remotus

Chlorocyphids

Blue jewel (Chlorocypha aphrodite)
Exquisite jewel (Chlorocypha cancellata)
Southern red jewel (Chlorocypha consueta)
Blue-tipped jewel (Chlorocypha curta)
Blue-fronted jewel (Chlorocypha cyanifrons)
Orange-nosed jewel (Chlorocypha dahli)
Little red jewel (Chlorocypha dispar)
Spotted jewel (Chlorocypha fabamacula)
Frigid jewel (Chlorocypha frigida)
Eastern red-tipped jewel (Chlorocypha glauca)
Orange jewel (Chlorocypha luminosa)
River jewel (Chlorocypha pyriformosa)
Western red-tipped jewel (Chlorocypha radix)
Rosy jewel (Chlorocypha rubida)
Blue-faced jewel (Chlorocypha selysi)
Southern red-tipped jewel (Chlorocypha seydeli)
Blue-nosed jewel (Chlorocypha trifaria)
Victoria's jewel (Chlorocypha victoriae)
Katanga jewel (Chlorocypha wittei)
Cyrano unicolor
Libellago aurantiaca
Libellago hyalina
Libellago lineata
Libellago rufescens
Libellago stigmatizans
Dancing jewel (Platycypha caligata)
Boulder jewel (Platycypha fitzsimonsi)
Forest jewel (Platycypha lacustris)
Beautiful jewel (Platycypha rufitibia)
Rhinocypha arguta
Rhinocypha biforata
Rhinocypha bisignata
Rhinocypha chaoi
Rhinocypha drusilla
Rhinocypha fenestrella
Rhinocypha ignipennis
Rhinocypha immaculata
Rhinocypha iridea
Rhinocypha pelops
Common blue jewel (Rhinocypha perforata)
Rhinocypha quadrimaculata
Rhinocypha spuria
Rhinocypha trifasciata
Rhinocypha unimaculata
Rhinocypha watsoni
Graceful jewel (Stenocypha gracilis)
Slender jewel (Stenocypha tenuis)

Platycnemidids
Species

Red-backed yellowwing (Allocnemis contraria)
Blue-tipped yellowwing (Allocnemis cyanura)
Orange yellowwing (Allocnemis elongata)
Dark yellowwing (Allocnemis flavipennis)
Goldtail (Allocnemis leucosticta)
Blue-shouldered threadtail (Allocnemis marshalli)
Rainbow yellowwing (Allocnemis nigripes)
Orange-tipped threadtail (Allocnemis pauli)
Blue yellowwing (Allocnemis subnodalis)
Allocnemis superba
Allocnemis wittei
Powder blue damselfly (Arabicnemis caerulea)
Calicnemia chaseni
Calicnemia doonensis
Calicnemia erythromelas
Calicnemia eximia
Calicnemia imitans
Calicnemia miles
Calicnemia miniata
Calicnemia mortoni
Calicnemia pulverulans
Calicnemia sinensis
Coeliccia albicauda
Coeliccia bimaculata
Coeliccia chromothorax
Coeliccia cyanomelas
Coeliccia didyma
Coeliccia doisuthepensis
Coeliccia flavicauda
Coeliccia kazukoae
Coeliccia loogali
Coeliccia poungyi
Coeliccia renifera
Coeliccia scutellum
Coeliccia yamasakii
Copera annulata
Copera chantaburii
Copera ciliata
Congo featherleg (Copera congolensis)
Copera guttifera
Copera marginipes
Eastern featherleg (Copera nyansana)
Copera rufipes
Little featherleg (Copera sikassoensis)
Copera vittata
Disparoneura quadrimaculata
Eastern red threadtail (Elattoneura acuta)
Elattoneura balli
Elattoneura cellularis
Elattoneura centrafricana
Sooty threadtail (Elattoneura frenulata)
Western red threadtail (Elattoneura girardi)
Common threadtail (Elattoneura glauca)
Elattoneura incerta
Elattoneura josemorai
Elattoneura lliba
Elattoneura nigra
Elattoneura pruinosa
Elattoneura tetrica
Orange-fronted threadtail (Elattoneura vittata)
Elattoneura vrijdaghi
Esme longistyla
Idiocnemis bidentata
Idiocnemis inaequidens
Idioneura ancilla
Indocnemis orang
Mesocnemis robusta
Common riverjack (Mesocnemis singularis)
Green-blue threadtail (Nososticta coelestina)
Nososticta erythrura
Nososticta plagiata
Fivespot threadtail (Nososticta solitaris)
Paramecocnemis erythrostigma
Orange featherleg (Platycnemis acutipennis)
Ivory featherleg (Platycnemis dealbata)
Kerville's featherleg (Platycnemis kervillei)
White featherleg (Platycnemis latipes)
White-legged damselfly (Platycnemis pennipes)
Barbary featherleg (Platycnemis subdilatata)
Prodasineura auricolor
Prodasineura autumnalis
Prodasineura coerulescens
Prodasineura collaris
Prodasineura croconota
Prodasineura hosei
Prodasineura laidlawii
Prodasineura odzalae
Prodasineura verticalis
White-fronted threadtail (Prodasineura villiersi)
Risiocnemis asahinai
Risiocnemis atripes
Risiocnemis atropurpurea
Tricklejack (Stenocnemis pachystigma)

Subspecies
Platycnemis pennipes nitidula

Synlestids

Conspicuous malachite (Chlorolestes conspicuus)
Drakensberg malachite (Chlorolestes draconicus)
Mountain malachite (Chlorolestes fasciatus)
Forest malachite (Chlorolestes tessellatus)
White malachite (Chlorolestes umbratus)
Megalestes distans
Megalestes haui
Megalestes heros
Megalestes kurahashii
Megalestes major
Megalestes micans
Sinolestes editus

Megapodagrionids

Agriomorpha fusca
Allopodagrion contortum
Archaeopodagrion armatum
Archaeopodagrion bicorne
Burmargiolestes melanothorax
Dimeragrion percubitale
Heteragrion aequatoriale
Heteragrion aurantiacum
Heteragrion bickorum
Heteragrion cooki
Heteragrion erythrogastrum
Heteragrion majus
Heteragrion makiritare
Highland flatwing (Heteragrion tricellulare)
Heteropodagrion croizati
Heteropodagrion sanguinipes
Mesagrion leucorrhinum
Mesopodagrion tibetanum
Oxystigma petiolatum
Oxystigma williamsoni
Paraphlebia quinta
Philogenia boliviana
Philogenia buenavista
Philogenia cassandra
Philogenia championi
Philogenia elisabeta
Philogenia leonora
Philogenia macuma
Philogenia mangosisa
Philogenia minteri
Philogenia peacocki
Philogenia redunca
Philogenia silvarum
Rhinagrion hainanense
Rhinagrion mima
Rhinagrion philippina
Rhinagrion viridatum
Rhipidolestes asatoi
Rhipidolestes cyanoflavus
Rhipidolestes janetae
Rhipidolestes owadai
Tatocnemis malgassica
Teinopodagrion angulatum
Teinopodagrion caquetanum
Teinopodagrion chinchaysuyum
Teinopodagrion croizati
Teinopodagrion curtum
Teinopodagrion decipiens
Teinopodagrion depressum
Teinopodagrion eretes
Teinopodagrion mercenarium
Teinopodagrion meridionale
Teinopodagrion nebulosum
Teinopodagrion schiessi
Teinopodagrion setigerum
Teinopodagrion yunka
Giant waterfall damsel (Thaumatoneura inopinata)

Gomphids

Amphigomphus hansoni
Amphigomphus nakamurai
Anisogomphus anderi
Anisogomphus bivittatus
Anisogomphus koxingai
Anisogomphus maacki
Anisogomphus occipitalis
Anormogomphus heteropterus
Southern dragon (Antipodogomphus acolythus)
Aphylla boliviana
Aphylla brasiliensis
Aphylla brevipes
Narrow-striped forceptail (Aphylla protracta)
Aphylla tenuis
Aphylla theodorina
Two-striped forceptail (Aphylla williamsoni)
Archaeogomphus hamatus
Asiagomphus acco
Asiagomphus pacificus
Asiagomphus septimus
Pale hunter (Austrogomphus amphiclitus)
Jade hunter (Austrogomphus ochraceus)
Burmagomphus divaricatus
Burmagomphus intinctus
Burmagomphus pyramidalis
Burmagomphus sivalikensis
Burmagomphus sowerbyi
Burmagomphus vermicularis
Burmagomphus williamsoni
Common thorntail (Ceratogomphus pictus)
Horned talontail (Crenigomphus cornutus)
Clubbed talontail (Crenigomphus hartmanni)
Kavango talontail (Crenigomphus kavangoensis)
Western talontail (Crenigomphus renei)
Cyanogomphus waltheri
Davidius aberrans
Davidius davidii
Davidius fruhstorferi
Davidius nanus
Desmogomphus paucinervis
Diaphlebia angustipennis
Diastatomma bicolor
Diastatomma gamblesi
Diastatomma multilineatum
Diastatomma selysi
Diastatomma soror
Diastatomma tricolor
Southeastern spinyleg (Dromogomphus armatus)
Black-shouldered spinyleg (Dromogomphus spinosus)
Volcano knobtail (Epigomphus echeverrii)
Epigomphus paludosus
Epigomphus quadracies
One-striped ringtail (Erpetogomphus bothrops)
Knob-tipped ringtail (Erpetogomphus constrictor)
Yellow-legged ringtail (Erpetogomphus crotalinus)
Serpent ringtail (Erpetogomphus lampropeltis)
Dark-shouldered ringtail (Erpetogomphus liopeltis)
Erpetogomphus sabaleticus
Erpetogomphus sipedon
Erpetogomphus tristani
Erpetogomphus viperinus
Hong Kong tusktail (Fukienogomphus choifongae)
Fukienogomphus prometheus
Fukienogomphus promineus
Gomphidia abbotti
Northern fingertail (Gomphidia bredoi)
Gomphidia confluens
Gomphidia gamblesi
Gomphidia kruegeri
Gomphidia maclachlani
Southern fingertail (Gomphidia quarrei)
Gomphidia t-nigrum
Gomphidictinus perakensis
Spine-crowned clubtail (Gomphus abbreviatus)
Levant clubtail (Gomphus davidi)
Blackwater clubtail (Gomphus dilatatus)
Lancet clubtail (Gomphus exilis)
River clubtail (Gomphus flavipes)
Splendid clubtail (Gomphus lineatifrons)
Gulf coast clubtail (Gomphus modestus)
Ozark clubtail (Gomphus ozarkensis)
Piedmont clubtail (Gomphus parvidens)
Western clubtail (Gomphus pulchellus)
Turkish clubtail (Gomphus schneiderii)
Septima's clubtail (Gomphus septima)
Common clubtail (Gomphus vulgatissimus)
Dragonhunter (Hagenius brevistylus)
Heliogomphus bakeri
Heliogomphus retroflexus
Heliogomphus scorpio
Heliogomphus selysi
Rainforest vicetail (Hemigomphus theischingeri)
Ictinogomphus angulosus
Ictinogomphus decoratus
Swamp tigertail (Ictinogomphus dundoensis)
Common tiger (Ictinogomphus ferox)
Ictinogomphus fraseri
Ictinogomphus pertinax
Ictinogomphus rapax
Ictinogomphus regisalberti
Ictinogomphus tenax
Isomma hieroglyphicum
Labrogomphus torvus
Lamelligomphus biforceps
Lamelligomphus camelus
Lamelligomphus hainanensis
Lamelligomphus ringens
Leptogomphus celebratus
Leptogomphus coomansi
Leptogomphus divaricatus
Leptogomphus gestroi
Leptogomphus perforatus
Leptogomphus risi
Leptogomphus yayeyamensis
Spined fairytail (Lestinogomphus angustus)
Lestinogomphus congoensis
Lestinogomphus matilei
Large horntail (Libyogomphus tenaculatus)
Bladetail (Lindenia tetraphylla)
Macrogomphus parallelogramma
Mastigogomphus chapini
Mastigogomphus dissimilis
Megalogomphus sommeri
Megalogomphus sumatranus
Melanocacus mungo
Melligomphus ardens
Merogomphus parvus
Merogomphus pavici
Microgomphus camerunensis
Microgomphus chelifer
Microgomphus jannyae
Microgomphus nyassicus
Congo scissortail (Microgomphus schoutedeni)
Microgomphus souteri
Microgomphus thailandica
Neogomphus bidens
Nepogomphus modestus
Nepogomphus walli
Neurogomphus alius
Striped siphontail (Neurogomphus featheri)
Neurogomphus fuscifrons
Neurogomphus martininus
Neurogomphus uelensis
Neurogomphus wittei
Zambezi siphontail (Neurogomphus zambeziensis)
Nihonogomphus cultratus
Nihonogomphus ruptus
Nihonogomphus thomassoni
Nihonogomphus viridis
Notogomphus dendrohyrax
Little longleg (Notogomphus dorsalis)
Notogomphus kilimandjaricus
Northern longleg (Notogomphus lecythus)
Clubbed longleg (Notogomphus leroyi)
Albertine longleg (Notogomphus lujai)
Notogomphus moorei
Southern yellowjack (Notogomphus praetorius)
Notogomphus spinosus
Notogomphus zernyi
Nychogomphus duaricus
Grappletail (Octogomphus specularis)
Green-eyed hooktail (Onychogomphus forcipatus)
Pale pincertail (Onychogomphus lefebvrii)
Onychogomphus nilgiriensis
Onychogomphus schmidti
Onychogomphus seydeli
Northern dark claspertail (Onychogomphus styx)
Gorge claspertail (Onychogomphus supinus)
Extra-striped snaketail (Ophiogomphus anomalus)
Arizona snaketail (Ophiogomphus arizonicus)
Brook snaketail (Ophiogomphus aspersus)
Bison snaketail (Ophiogomphus bison)
Green gomphid (Ophiogomphus cecilia)
Boreal snaketail (Ophiogomphus colubrinus)
Pygmy snaketail (Ophiogomphus howei)
Sinuous snaketail (Ophiogomphus occidentis)
Ophiogomphus reductus
Saint Croix snaketail (Ophiogomphus susbehcha)
Orientogomphus minor
Paragomphus abnormis
Paragomphus acuminatus
Highland hooktail (Paragomphus alluaudi)
Paragomphus bredoi
Paragomphus capitatus
Paragomphus capricornis
Rock hocktail (Paragomphus cognatus)
Corkscrew hooktail (Paragomphus elpidius)
Common hooktail (Paragomphus genei)
Paragomphus lacustris
Lined hooktail (Paragomphus lineatus)
Great hooktail (Paragomphus magnus)
Paragomphus nigroviridis
Paragomphus nyasicus
Paragomphus pardalinus
Small hooktail (Paragomphus pumilio)
Flapper hooktail (Paragomphus sabicus)
Paragomphus serrulatus
Green-fronted hooktail (Paragomphus viridior)
Perissogomphus stevensi
Peruviogomphus moyobambus
Peruviogomphus pearsoni
Phaenandrogomphus asthenes
Phaenandrogomphus tonkinicus
Phyllocycla basidenta
Phyllocycla breviphylla
Phyllocycla hespera
Phyllocycla titschacki
Phyllocycla viridipleuris
Phyllocycla volsella
Phyllogomphoides andromeda
Phyllogomphoides angularis
Phyllogomphoides annectens
Phyllogomphoides apiculatus
Phyllogomphoides cepheus
Phyllogomphoides duodentatus
Phyllogomphoides lieftincki
Phyllogomphoides nayaritensis
Four-striped leaftail (Phyllogomphoides stigmatus)
Phyllogomphus aethiops
Phyllogomphus annulus
Phyllogomphus coloratus
Phyllogomphus moundi
Phyllogomphus pseudoccidentalis
Crowned leaftail (Phyllogomphus schoutedeni)
Bold leaftail (Phyllogomphus selysi)
Platygomphus dolabratus
Bolivian sanddragon (Progomphus boliviensis)
Progomphus brachycnemis
Progomphus complicatus
Progomphus costalis
Progomphus herrerae
Progomphus incurvatus
Progomphus intricatus
Progomphus mexicanus
Progomphus montanus
Progomphus phyllochromus
Progomphus pijpersi
Progomphus pygmaeus
Scalmogomphus bistrigatus
Sieboldius deflexus
Sieboldius japponicus
Golden flangetail (Sinictinogomphus clavatus)
Stylogomphus chunliuae
Stylogomphus inglisi
Stylogomphus suzukii
Riverine clubtail (Stylurus amnicola)
Stylurus clathratus
Shining clubtail (Stylurus ivae)
Stylurus nanningensis
Russet-tipped clubtail (Stylurus plagiatus)
Zebra clubtail (Stylurus scudderi)
Arrow clubtail (Stylurus spiniceps)
Tibiagomphus uncatus
Tragogomphus aurivillii
Trigomphus beatus
Trigomphus citimus

Cordulegastrids

Anotogaster gregoryi
Anotogaster nipalensis
Cordulegaster brevistigma
Apache spiketail (Cordulegaster diadema)
Blue-eyed goldenring (Cordulegaster insignis)
Cordulegaster mzymtae
Arrowhead spiketail (Cordulegaster obliqua)
Turkish goldenring (Cordulegaster picta)
Ouachita spiketail (Cordulegaster talaria)
Neallogaster hermionae
Neallogaster latifrons
Sinorogomphus nasutus
Sinorogomphus tunti

Corduliids

Dusk dragonfly (Antipodochlora braueri)
Downy emerald (Cordulia aenea)
Epitheca marginata
Uhler's sundragon (Helocordulia uhleri)
African emerald (Hemicordulia africana)
Hemicordulia asiatica
Australian emerald (Hemicordulia australiae)
Fat-bellied emerald (Hemicordulia continentalis)
Hemicordulia fidelis
Hemicordulia intermedia
Hemicordulia lulico
Hemicordulia okinawensis
Hemicordulia similis
Hemicordulia tenera
Heteronaias heterodoxa
Offshore emerald (Metaphya tillyardi)
Alabama shadowdragon (Neurocordulia alabamensis)
Umber shadowdragon (Neurocordulia obsoleta)
Cinnamon shadowdragon (Neurocordulia virginiensis)
Western swamp emerald (Procordulia affinis)
Yellow spotted dragonfly (Procordulia grayi)
Eastern swamp emerald (Procordulia jacksoniensis)
Ranger dragonfly (Procordulia smithii)
Quebec emerald (Somatochlora brevicincta)
Lake emerald (Somatochlora cingulata)
Somatochlora dido
Somatochlora flavomaculata
Delicate emerald (Somatochlora franklini)
Hudsonian emerald (Somatochlora hudsonica)
Incurvate emerald (Somatochlora incurvata)
Balkan emerald (Somatochlora meridionalis)
Brilliant emerald (Somatochlora metallica)
Beaverpond baskettail (Tetragoneuria canis)
Florida baskettail (Tetragoneuria stella)

Calopterygids

Archineura hetaerinoides
Archineura incarnata
Caliphaea confusa
Caliphaea nitens
River jewelwing (Calopteryx aequabilis)
Appalachian jewelwing (Calopteryx angustipennis)
Calopteryx atrata
Calopteryx cornelia
Copper demoiselle (Calopteryx haemorrhoidalis)
Calopteryx melli
Calopteryx orientalis
Banded demoiselle (Calopteryx splendens)
Beautiful demoiselle (Calopteryx virgo)
Western demoiselle (Calopteryx xanthostoma)
Echo margarita
Echo modesta
Echo uniformis
Hetaerina aurora
Hook-tipped rubyspot (Hetaerina curvicauda)
Hetaerina duplex
Hetaerina flavipennis
Hetaerina hebe
Hetaerina infecta
Hetaerina majuscula
Hetaerina sempronia
Canyon rubyspot (Hetaerina vulnerata)
Tepui shinywing (Iridictyon myersi)
White-banded shinywing (Iridictyon trebbaui)
Matrona basilaris
Mnais andersoni
Mnais gregoryi
Mnais mneme
Mnais pruinosa
Mnais yunosukei
Mnesarete devillei
Mnesarete drepane
Mnesarete ephippium
Mnesarete guttifera
Neurobasis anumariae
Neurobasis chinensis
Neurobasis kimminsi
Neurobasis longipes
Ormenophlebia imperatrix
Ormenophlebia regina
Ormenophlebia saltuum
Forest flashwing (Phaon camerunensis)
Glistening demoiselle (Phaon iridipennis)
Spring bluewing (Sapho bicolor)
Western bluewing (Sapho ciliata)
Glorious bluewing (Sapho gloriosa)
Eastern bluewing (Sapho orichalcea)
Broad-winged sparklewing (Umma cincta)
Metallic sparklewing (Umma electa)
Bare-bellied sparklewing (Umma longistigma)
Hairy-bellied sparklewing (Umma mesostigma)
Sapphire sparklewing (Umma saphirina)
Vestalaria miao
Vestalaria smaragdina
Vestalaria velata
Vestalaria vinnula
Vestalis amethystina
Vestalis amoena
Vestalis anne
Vestalis apicalis
Vestalis atropha
Vestalis gracilis
Vestalis venusta

Coenagrionids
Species

Acanthagrion ablutum
Acanthagrion adustum
Acanthagrion chacoense
Acanthagrion cuyabae
Acanthagrion inexpectum
Acanthagrion kennedii
Acanthagrion longispinosum
Acanthagrion obsoletum
Acanthagrion peruanum
Acanthagrion peruvianum
Acanthagrion speculum
Acanthagrion tepuiense
Acanthagrion truncatum
Acanthagrion yungarum
Blue slim (Aciagrion africanum)
Aciagrion approximans
Aciagrion azureum
Aciagrion borneense
Aciagrion fragile
Graceful slim (Aciagrion gracile)
Long slim (Aciagrion heterosticta)
Aciagrion hisopa
Aciagrion migratum
Aciagrion occidentale
Aciagrion olympicum
Aciagrion pallidum
Swamp slim (Aciagrion steeleae)
Aciagrion tillyardi
Aeolagrion axine
Elongate bluet (Africallagma elongatum)
Africallagma glaucum
Africallagma pallidulum
Spotted bluet (Africallagma pseudelongatum)
Sapphire bluet (Africallagma sapphirinum)
Peak bluet (Africallagma sinuatum)
Fragile bluet (Africallagma subtile)
Forest bluet (Africallagma vaginale)
Blue wisp (Agriocnemis angolensis)
Agriocnemis clauseni
Agriocnemis dabreui
Little wisp (Agriocnemis exilis)
White-masked wisp (Agriocnemis falcifera)
Agriocnemis femina
Forceps wisp (Agriocnemis forcipata)
Gracious wisp (Agriocnemis gratiosa)
Highland wisp (Agriocnemis inversa)
Agriocnemis keralensis
Agriocnemis lacteola
Forest wisp (Agriocnemis maclachlani)
Agriocnemis minima
Agriocnemis nana
Agriocnemis pieris
Pinhey's wisp (Agriocnemis pinheyi)
Wandering midget (Agriocnemis pygmaea)
Orange wisp (Agriocnemis ruberrima)
Nile wisp (Agriocnemis sania)
Agriocnemis splendissima
Congo wisp (Agriocnemis stygia)
Lesser pincer-tailed wisp (Agriocnemis victoria)
Sahel wisp (Agriocnemis zerafica)
Amazoneura westfalli
Eastern red damsel (Amphiagrion saucium)
Amphiallagma parvum
Amphicnemis martini
Anisagrion allopterum
Anisagrion inornatum
Antiagrion gayi
Antiagrion grinbergsi
Archibasis crucigera
Archibasis oscillans
Archibasis viola
Paiute dancer (Argia alberta)
Blue-fronted dancer (Argia apicalis)
Argia croceipennis
Argia dives
Argia frequentula
Argia garrisoni
Argia gerhardi
Argia hamulata
Huanacina dancer (Argia huanacina)
Argia inculta
Argia infrequentula
Argia kokama
Leonora's dancer (Argia leonorae)
Argia limitata
Sooty dancer (Argia lugens)
Powdered dancer (Argia moesta)
Argia nigrior
Amethyst dancer (Argia pallens)
Springwater dancer (Argia plana)
Argia pocomana
Argia popoluca
Golden-winged dancer (Argia rhoadsi)
Tarascan dancer (Argia tarascana)
Blue-tipped dancer (Argia tibialis)
Argia underwoodi
Argia variata
Westfall (Argia westfalli)
Argia yungensis
Red-tipped shadefly (Argiocnemis rubescens)
Austroagrion exclamationis
Sailing azuret (Azuragrion nigridorsum)
Somali azuret (Azuragrion somalicum)
Tiny azuret (Azuragrion vansomereni)
Cercion malayanum
Ceriagrion aeruginosum
Green-eyed waxtail (Ceriagrion annulatum)
Orange-tailed sprite (Ceriagrion auranticum)
Ceriagrion azureum
Blue-fronted waxtail (Ceriagrion bakeri)
Ceriagrion bellona
Ceriagrion calamineum
Ceriagrion cerinorubellum
Ceriagrion chaoi
Green-fronted waxtail (Ceriagrion corallinum)
Ceriagrion coromandelianum
Ceriagrion fallax
Common waxtail (Ceriagrion glabrum)
Little red waxtail (Ceriagrion ignitum)
Ceriagrion indochinense
Little orange waxtail (Ceriagrion kordofanicum)
Ceriagrion malaisei
Ceriagrion melanurum
East coast waxtail (Ceriagrion mourae)
Ceriagrion olivaceum
Ceriagrion praetermissum
Red-tipped waxtail (Ceriagrion rubellocerinum)
Cream-sided waxtail (Ceriagrion sakejii)
Plain waxtail (Ceriagrion suave)
Fiery waxtail (Ceriagrion tricrenaticeps)
Orange-red waxtail (Ceriagrion varians)
Yellow-faced waxtail (Ceriagrion whellani)
Norfolk damselfly (Coenagrion armatum)
Mediterranean bluet (Coenagrion caerulescens)
Spearhead bluet (Coenagrion hastulatum)
Coenagrion lyelli
Ornate bluet (Coenagrion ornatum)
Coenagrion ponticum
Azure damselfly (Coenagrion puella)
Variable damselfly (Coenagrion pulchellum)
Taiga bluet (Coenagrion resolutum)
Dainty damselfly (Coenagrion scitulum)
Coenagrion terue
Cyanallagma bonariense
Cyanallagma interruptum
Denticulobasis dunklei
Drepanoneura flinti
Drepanoneura loutoni
Drepanoneura muzoni
Drepanoneura peruviensis
Drepanoneura tennesseni
Tule bluet (Enallagma carunculatum)
Enallagma circulatum
Common blue damselfly (Enallagma cyathigerum)
Sandhill bluet (Enallagma davisi)
Desert bluet (Enallagma deserti)
Atlantic bluet (Enallagma doubledayi)
Burgundy bluet (Enallagma dubium)
Marsh bluet (Enallagma ebrium)
Stream bluet (Enallagma exsulans)
New England bluet (Enallagma laterale)
Enallagma minusculum
Slender bluet (Enallagma traviatum)
Epipleoneura capilliformis
Epipleoneura fuscaenea
Epipleoneura kaxuriana
Epipleoneura lamina
Epipleoneura manauensis
Epipleoneura metallica
Epipleoneura williamsoni
Epipotoneura nehalennia
Goblet-marked damselfly (Erythromma lindenii)
Small red-eyed damselfly (Erythromma viridulum)
Helveciagrion obsoletum
Helveciagrion simulacrum
Painted damsel (Hesperagrion heterodoxum)
Homeoura ambigua
Ischnura acuticauda
Gossamer damselfly (Ischnura aurora)
Ischnura chingaza
Ischnura cruzi
Ischnura cyane
Blue-tailed damselfly (Ischnura elegans)
Desert bluetail (Ischnura evansi)
Ischnura fluviatilis
Ischnura forcipata
Oasis bluetail (Ischnura fountaineae)
Island bluetail (Ischnura genei)
Iberian bluetail (Ischnura graellsii)
Western forktail (Ischnura perparva)
Fragile forktail (Ischnura posita)
Scarce blue-tailed damselfly (Ischnura pumilio)
Rambur's forktail (Ischnura ramburii)
Ischnura rufostigma
Sahara bluetail (Ischnura saharensis)
Tropical bluetail (Ischnura senegalensis)
Leptagrion macrurum
Leptagrion perlongum
Caribbean swampdamsel (Leptobasis candelaria)
Leptobasis inversa
Lucifer swampdamsel (Leptobasis lucifer)
Leptobasis mauffrayi
Red-tipped swampdamsel (Leptobasis vacillans)
Blue-tipped helicopter (Mecistogaster buckleyi)
Ornate helicopter (Mecistogaster ornata)
Adytum swamp damselfly (Megalagrion adytum)
Koele mountain damselfly (Megalagrion koelense)
Mesamphiagrion occultum
Mesamphiagrion risi
Mesoleptobasis incus
Metaleptobasis foreli
Metaleptobasis furcifera
Metaleptobasis knopfi
Metaleptobasis mauffrayi
Metaleptobasis prostrata
Metaleptobasis westfalli
Minagrion mecistogastrum
Minagrion waltheri
Mortonagrion aborense
Mortonagrion falcatum
Sphagnum sprite (Nehalennia gracilis)
Neoerythromma gladiolatum
Amelia's threadtail (Neoneura amelia)
Neoneura bilinearis
Neoneura desana
Neoneura fulvicollis
Onychargia atrocyana
Oreiallagma acutum
Oreiallagma oreas
Oreiallagma quadricolor
Oxyagrion bruchi
Oxyagrion impunctatum
Oxyagrion miniopsis
Oxyagrion sulinum
Oxyagrion tennesseni
Oxyallagma colombianum
Palaiargia humida
Dusky lilysquatter (Paracercion calamorum)
Paracercion dorothea
Eastern lilysquatter (Paracercion melanotum)
Paracercion v-nigrum
Pericnemis stictica
Phoenicagrion paulsoni
Angola bluet (Pinheyagrion angolicum)
Round-winged bluet (Proischnura rotundipennis)
Fork-tailed bluet (Proischnura subfurcata)
Protoneura amatoria
Protoneura aurantiaca
Protoneura calverti
Protoneura cupida
Purple threadtail (Protoneura dunklei)
Red-legged threadtail (Protoneura sanguinipes)
Sulphury threadtail (Protoneura sulfurata)
Scarlet-backed threadtail (Protoneura tenuis)
Acacia sprite (Pseudagrion acaciae)
Pseudagrion aguessei
Assegaai sprite (Pseudagrion assegaii)
Pseudagrion australasiae
Pseudagrion bernardi
Springwater sprite (Pseudagrion caffrum)
Orange-faced sprite (Pseudagrion camerunense)
Yellow-faced sprite (Pseudagrion citricola)
Catshead sprite (Pseudagrion coelestis)
Black sprite (Pseudagrion commoniae)
Pseudagrion cyathiforme
Pseudagrion decorum
Dening's sprite (Pseudagrion deningi)
Pseudagrion divaricatum
Mountain sprite (Pseudagrion draconis)
Blue-faced sprite (Pseudagrion emarginatum)
Pseudagrion epiphonematicum
Fisher's sprite (Pseudagrion fisheri)
Palmiet sprite (Pseudagrion furcigerum)
Great sprite (Pseudagrion gamblesi)
Pseudagrion gigas
Blue-green sprite (Pseudagrion glaucescens)
Cryptic sprite (Pseudagrion glaucoideum)
Slender sprite (Pseudagrion glaucum)
Pseudagrion greeni
Painted sprite (Pseudagrion hageni)
Swarthy sprite (Pseudagrion hamoni)
Helena sprite (Pseudagrion helenae)
Yellow-legged sprite (Pseudagrion hemicolon)
Pseudagrion hypermelas
Flame-headed riverdamsel (Pseudagrion ignifer)
Inconspicuous sprite (Pseudagrion inconspicuum)
Powder-faced sprite (Pseudagrion kersteni)
Forest sprite (Pseudagrion kibalense)
Pseudagrion laidlawi
Pseudagrion lalakense
Pseudagrion lindicum
Green-striped sprite (Pseudagrion makabusiense)
Pseudagrion malabaricum
Pseudagrion malagasoides
Masai sprite (Pseudagrion massaicum)
Farmbush sprite (Pseudagrion melanicterum)
Blue riverdamsel (Pseudagrion microcephalum)
Nile sprite (Pseudagrion niloticum)
Bluetail sprite (Pseudagrion nubicum)
Pseudagrion pruinosum
Cameroon sprite (Pseudagrion risi)
Pseudagrion rubriceps
Albertine sprite (Pseudagrion rufocinctum)
Dark sprite (Pseudagrion rufostigma)
Slate sprite (Pseudagrion salisburyense)
Pseudagrion serrulatum
Pseudagrion simonae
Pseudagrion simplicilaminatum
Variable sprite (Pseudagrion sjoestedti)
Pseudagrion spencei
Upland sprite (Pseudagrion spernatum)
Cherry-eye sprite (Pseudagrion sublacteum)
Blue-sided sprite (Pseudagrion sudanicum)
Pseudagrion superbum
Syrian sprite (Pseudagrion syriacum)
Orange slimsprite (Pseudagrion thenartum)
Wing-tailed sprite (Pseudagrion torridum)
Vaal sprite (Pseudagrion vaalense)
Pseudagrion williamsoni
Large red damselfly (Pyrrhosoma nymphula)
Rhodischnura nursei
Schistolobos boliviensis
Teinobasis ariel
Teinobasis filamentum
Teinobasis rajah
Teinobasis samaritis
Teinobasis superba
Telebasis brevis
Telebasis carmesina
Telebasis corallina
Telebasis demararum
Marsh firetail (Telebasis digiticollis)
Telebasis garleppi
Telebasis griffinii
Oasis firetail (Telebasis incolumis)
Telebasis limoncocha
Telebasis livida
Telebasis milleri
Selva firetail (Telebasis racenisi)
Red-and-blue firetail (Telebasis rubricauda)
Forcipate firetail (Telebasis versicolor)
Telebasis willinki
Tuberculobasis cardinalis
Alpine redcoat damselfly (Xanthocnemis sinclairi)
Chatham redcoat damselfly (Xanthocnemis tuanuii)
Common redcoat damselfly (Xanthocnemis zealandica)
Exclamation damsel (Zoniagrion exclamationis)

Subspecies
Pele damselfly (Megalagrion amaurodytum peles)

Euphaeids

Anisopleura comes
Anisopleura furcata
Anisopleura lestoides
Anisopleura qingyuanensis
Anisopleura subplatystyla
Bayadera bidentata
Bayadera continentalis
Bayadera indica
Bayadera melanopteryx
Cryptophaea vietnamensis
Dysphaea basitincta
Dysphaea dimidiata
Dysphaea gloriosa
Dysphaea lugens
Odalisque (Epallage fatime)
Euphaea amphicyana
Euphaea aspasia
Euphaea bocki
Euphaea cardinalis
Euphaea decorata
Euphaea dispar
Euphaea formosa
Euphaea fraseri
Euphaea guerini
Euphaea impar
Euphaea masoni
Euphaea ochracea
Euphaea subcostalis
Euphaea superba

Synthemistids

Twinspot tigertail (Archaeosynthemis leachii)
Variable tigertail (Eusynthemis aurolineata)
Mountain tigertail (Eusynthemis tillyardi)
Royal tigertail (Parasynthemis regina)
Synthemis campioni
Synthemis miranda
Synthemis primigenia

Macromiids

Regal pond cruiser (Epophthalmia elegans)
Epophthalmia frontalis
Epophthalmia vittata
Epophthalmia vittigera
Macromia amphigena
Macromia annaimallaiensis
Bronzed river cruiser (Macromia annulata)
Macromia arachnomima
Macromia bellicosa
Macromia berlandi
Macromia calliope
Macromia chaiyaphumensis
Macromia cingulata
Macromia clio
Macromia cupricincta
Macromia cydippe
Macromia ellisoni
Macromia euterpe
Macromia flavocolorata
Macromia ida
Macromia irata
Macromia malleifera
Macromia manchurica
Macromia moorei
Macromia pinratani
Macromia unca
Club-tailed cruiser (Macromia urania)
Macromia westwoodii
Phyllomacromia aeneothorax
Phyllomacromia aequatorialis
Sahel cruiser (Phyllomacromia africana)
Phyllomacromia amicorum
Golden-banded cruiser (Phyllomacromia aureozona)
Phyllomacromia bicristulata
Phyllomacromia bispina
Phyllomacromia caneri
Phyllomacromia congolica
Two-banded cruiser (Phyllomacromia contumax)
Phyllomacromia flavimitella
Phyllomacromia gamblesi
Phyllomacromia hervei
Phyllomacromia insignis
Crescent-faced cruiser (Phyllomacromia kimminsi)
Phyllomacromia maesi
Sombre cruiser (Phyllomacromia melania)
Black cruiser (Phyllomacromia monoceros)
Clubbed cruiser (Phyllomacromia overlaeti)
Phyllomacromia pallidinervis
Phyllomacromia paula
Darting cruiser (Phyllomacromia picta)
Western savanna cruiser (Phyllomacromia pseudafricana)
Phyllomacromia schoutedeni
Phyllomacromia seydeli
Phyllomacromia sophia
Forest cruiser (Phyllomacromia sylvatica)
Phyllomacromia unifasciata

Lestids

Blue damselfly (Austrolestes colensonis)
Eastern willow spreadwing (Chalcolestes parvidens)
Green emerald damselfly (Chalcolestes viridis)
Indolestes cyaneus
Indolestes gracilis
Indolestes peregrinus
Yellow-winged spreadwing (Lestes amicus)
Lestes auritus
Southern emerald damselfly (Lestes barbarus)
Dusky spreadwing (Lestes concinnus)
Lestes curvatus
Lestes dichrostigma
Cryptic spreadwing (Lestes dissimulans)
Lestes dorothea
Scarce emerald damselfly (Lestes dryas)
Lestes elatus
Lestes helix
Lestes henshawi
Tawny spreadwing (Lestes ictericus)
Dark spreadwing (Lestes macrostigma)
Lestes nodalis
Ochre spreadwing (Lestes ochraceus)
Pallid spreadwing (Lestes pallidus)
Lestes paulistus
Pinhey's spreadwing (Lestes pinheyi)
Highland spreadwing (Lestes plagiatus)
Lestes praemorsus
Lestes quercifolia
Common spreadwing (Lestes sponsa)
Antillean spreadwing (Lestes spumarius)
Lestes thoracicus
Lestes tikalus
Spotted spreadwing (Lestes tridens)
Sickle spreadwing (Lestes uncifer)
Lestes undulatus
Small emerald spreadwing (Lestes virens)
Smoky spreadwing (Lestes virgatus)
Lestes viridulus
Orolestes octomaculatus
Orolestes selysi
Orolestes wallacei
Platylestes platystylus
Common winter damsel (Sympecma fusca)
Siberian winter damsel (Sympecma paedisca)

Aeshnids

Aeschnophlebia longistigma
Blue-eyed hawker (Aeshna affinis)
Lancer dragonfly (Aeshna brevistyla)
Azure hawker (Aeshna caerulea)
Canada darner (Aeshna canadensis)
Mottled darner (Aeshna clepsydra)
Aeshna crenata
Southern hawker (Aeshna cyanea)
Brown hawker (Aeshna grandis)
Green-eyed hawker (Aeshna isoceles)
Common hawker (Aeshna juncea)
Migrant hawker (Aeshna mixta)
Aeshna ossiliensis
Paddle-tailed darner (Aeshna palmata)
Persephone's darner (Aeshna persephone)
Aeshna petalura
Baltic hawker (Aeshna serrata)
Shadow darner (Aeshna umbrosa)
Green hawker (Aeshna viridis)
Shadow hawker (Afroaeschna scotias)
Anaciaeschna donaldi
Anaciaeschna jaspidea
Anaciaeschna martini
Evening hawker (Anaciaeschna triangulifera)
Black-and-blue emperor (Anax chloromelas)
Blue-spotted comet darner (Anax concolor)
Dark emperor (Anax congoliath)
Hemianax ephippiger (Anax ephippiger)
Lesser green emperor (Anax guttatus)
Anax immaculifrons
Emperor (Anax imperator)
Anax indicus
Green darner (Anax junius)
Comet darner (Anax longipes)
Blue-spotted emperor (Anax nigrofasciatus)
Anax panybeus
Baron dragonfly (Anax papuensis)
Lesser emperor (Anax parthenope)
Orange emperor (Anax speratus)
Black emperor (Anax tristis)
Anax tumorifer
Andaeschna rufipes
Multi-spotted darner (Austroaeschna multipunctata)
Southern giant darner (Austrophlebia costalis)
Ocellated darner (Boyeria grafiana)
Boyeria karubei
Hairy dragonfly (Brachytron pratense)
Eastern spectre (Caliaeschna microstigma)
Cephalaeschna dinghuensis
Cephalaeschna orbifrons
Cephalaeschna viridifrons
Blue-faced darner (Coryphaeschna adnexa)
Coryphaeschna huaorania
Regal darner (Coryphaeschna ingens)
Wide-faced darner (Dendroaeschna conspersa)
Ochre-tipped darner (Dromaeschna weiskei)
Harlequin darner (Gomphaeschna furcillata)
Giant duskhawker (Gynacantha africana)
Gynacantha basiguttata
Gynacantha bayadera
Black-kneed duskhawker (Gynacantha bullata)
Greater girdled duskhawker (Gynacantha cylindrata)
Plain duskhawker (Gynacantha immaculifrons)
Gynacantha incisura
Little duskhawker (Gynacantha manderica)
Gynacantha nausicaa
Twilight darner (Gynacantha nervosa)
Yellow-legged duskhawker (Gynacantha nigeriensis)
Gynacantha saltatrix
Dark-rayed duskhawker (Gynacantha sextans)
Gynacantha subinterrupta
Usambara duskhawker (Gynacantha usambarica)
Lesser girdled duskhawker (Gynacantha vesiculata)
Brown duskhawker (Gynacantha villosa)
Gynacanthaeschna sikkima
Heliaeschna crassa
Blade-tipped duskhawker (Heliaeschna cynthiae)
Black-banded duskhawker (Heliaeschna fuliginosa)
Heliaeschna idae
Hybrid duskhawker (Heliaeschna sembe)
Heliaeschna simplicia
Pale duskhawker (Heliaeschna trinervulata)
Uganda duskhawker (Heliaeschna ugandica)
Heliaeschna uninervulata
Indaeschna grubaueri
Cyrano darner (Nasiaeschna pentacantha)
Neuraeschna harpya
Neuraeschna titania
Periaeschna flinti
Periaeschna magdalena
Periaeschna nocturnalis
Periaeschna zhangzhouensis
Meru hawker (Pinheyschna meruensis)
Bullseye hawker (Pinheyschna rileyi)
Stream hawker (Pinheyschna subpupillata)
Planaeschna milnei
Planaeschna risi
Planaeschna suichangensis
Planaeschna taiwana
Polycanthagyna erythromelas
Polycanthagyna melanictera
Polycanthagyna ornithocephala
Malachite darner (Remartinia luteipennis)
Rhionaeschna diffinis
Arroyo darner (Rhionaeschna dugesi)
Rhionaeschna intricata
Rhionaeschna peralta
Rhionaeschna planaltica
Sarasaeschna pryeri
Tetracanthagyna bakeri
Tetracanthagyna plagiata
Tetracanthagyna waterhousei
Caribbean darner (Triacanthagyna caribbea)
Triacanthagyna obscuripennis
Phantom darner (Triacanthagyna trifida)
Triacanthagyna williamsoni
Friendly hawker (Zosteraeschna minuscula)

Libellulids
Species

Grizzled pintail (Acisoma panorpoides)
Ivory pintail (Acisoma trifidum)
Aethiothemis basilewskyi
Aethiothemis bella
Aethiothemis bequaerti
Aethiothemis circe
Aethiothemis coryndoni
Aethiothemis ellioti
Aethiothemis erythromelas
Aethiothemis incongruens
Aethiothemis palustris
Aethiothemis solitaria
Aethriamanta aethra
Aethriamanta brevipennis
Aethriamanta gracilis
Pygmy basker (Aethriamanta rezia)
Agrionoptera cynthiae
Agrionoptera insignis
Agrionoptera longitudinalis
Agrionoptera similis
Silver-spotted skimmer (Argyrothemis argentea)
Atoconeura biordinata
Atoconeura eudoxia
Atoconeura kenya
Western highlander (Atoconeura luxata)
Atoconeura pseudeudoxia
Swamp flat-tail (Austrothemis nigrescens)
Bironides superstes
Brachydiplax chalybea
Brachydiplax denticauda
Brachydiplax duivenbodei
Brachydiplax farinosa
Brachydiplax sobrina
Brachygonia oculata
Four-spotted pennant (Brachymesia gravida)
Tawny pennant (Brachymesia herbida)
Brachythemis contaminata
Brachythemis impartita
Red groundling (Brachythemis lacustris)
Brachythemis leucosticta
Wilson's groundling (Brachythemis wilsoni)
Horned rock-dweller (Bradinopyga cornuta)
Bradinopyga geminata
Red rockdweller (Bradinopyga strachani)
Brechmorhoga praedatrix
Camacinia gigantea
Camacinia othello
Cannaphila vibex
Red-veined pennant (Celithemis bertha)
Calico pennant (Celithemis elisa)
Martha's pennant (Celithemis martha)
Inspector (Chalcostephia flavifrons)
Chalybeothemis fluviatilis
Cratilla lineata
Cratilla metallica
Crocothemis brevistigma
Divisa scarlet (Crocothemis divisa)
Scarlet dragonfly (Crocothemis erythraea)
Little scarlet (Crocothemis sanguinolenta)
Granite scarlet (Crocothemis saxicolor)
Scarlet skimmer (Crocothemis servilia)
Bluebolt (Cyanothemis simpsoni)
Dasythemis mincki
Deielia phaon
Diastatops dimidiata
Diastatops pullata
Diplacina braueri
Diplacina lisa
Diplacina nana
Diplacina paula
Red percher dragonfly (Diplacodes bipunctata)
Little percher (Diplacodes deminuta)
Diplacodes exilis
Black percher (Diplacodes lefebvrii)
Barbet percher (Diplacodes luminans)
Charcoal-winged percher (Diplacodes nebulosa)
Dwarf percher (Diplacodes pumila)
Diplacodes trivialis
Checkered setwing (Dythemis fugax)
Swift setwing (Dythemis velox)
Sunlight firebelly (Eleuthemis buettikoferi)
Epithemis mariae
Erythemis carmelita
Red pondhawk (Erythemis haematogastra)
Claret pondhawk (Erythemis mithroides)
Pin-tailed pondhawk (Erythemis plebeja)
Eastern pondhawk (Erythemis simplicicollis)
Great pondhawk (Erythemis vesiculosa)
Erythrodiplax andagoya
Erythrodiplax cleopatra
Erythrodiplax fulva
Erythrodiplax ines
Erythrodiplax juliana
Erythrodiplax leticia
Erythrodiplax lygaea
Erythrodiplax maculosa
Erythrodiplax ochracea
Erythrodiplax pallida
Erythrodiplax paraguayensis
White-eyed skimmer (Fylgia amazonica)
Tiny sylph (Gynothemis pumila)
Saddled jungleskimmer (Hadrothemis camarensis)
Robust jungleskimmer (Hadrothemis coacta)
Scarlet jungleskimmer (Hadrothemis defecta)
Slender jungleskimmer (Hadrothemis infesta)
Red jungle-skimmer (Hadrothemis scabrifrons)
Variable jungleskimmer (Hadrothemis versuta)
Hadrothemis vrijdaghi
Hemistigma affine
African pied-spot (Hemistigma albipunctum)
Huonia arborophila
Huonia thais
Hydrobasileus croceus
Hylaeothemis clementia
Indothemis limbata
Scarlet grenadier (Lathrecista asiatica)
Dark whiteface (Leucorrhinia albifrons)
Lilypad whiteface (Leucorrhinia caudalis)
White-faced darter (Leucorrhinia dubia)
Frosted whiteface (Leucorrhinia frigida)
Crimson-ringed whiteface (Leucorrhinia glacialis)
Large white-faced darter (Leucorrhinia pectoralis)
Comanche skimmer (Libellula comanche)
Neon skimmer (Libellula croceipennis)
Spangled skimmer (Libellula cyanea)
Broad-bodied chaser (Libellula depressa)
Libellula foliata
Scarce chaser (Libellula fulva)
Widow skimmer (Libellula luctuosa)
Libellula melli
Four-spotted chaser (Libellula quadrimaculata)
Lyriothemis biappendiculata
Lyriothemis bivittata
Lyriothemis cleis
Lyriothemis elegantissima
Lyriothemis magnificata
Lyriothemis meyeri
Wide-bellied skimmer (Lyriothemis pachygastra)
Lyriothemis tricolor
Cora's pennant (Macrodiplax cora)
Macrothemis brevidens
Antillean sylph (Macrothemis celeno)
Macrothemis flavescens
Macrothemis hahneli
Macrothemis hemichlora
Macrothemis heteronycha
Macrothemis idalia
Straw-colored sylph (Macrothemis inacuta)
Macrothemis lauriana
Macrothemis tenuis
Ringed leaftipper (Malgassophlebia bispina)
Hyacinth glider (Miathyria marcella)
Artemis dasher (Micrathyria artemis)
Black dasher (Micrathyria atra)
Blue-tipped dasher (Micrathyria caerulistyla)
Micrathyria catenata
Caribbean dasher (Micrathyria dissocians)
Forest dasher (Micrathyria hippolyte)
Micrathyria longifasciata
Micrathyria schumanni
Micrathyria spinifera
Micrathyria spuria
Micrathyria stawiarskii
Micrathyria sympriona
Pale-footed dasher (Micrathyria tibialis)
Stream micmac (Micromacromia camerunica)
Small micmac (Micromacromia zygoptera)
Misagria bimacula
Nannophlebia anatya
Common archtail (Nannophlebia risi)
Eastern pygmyfly (Nannophya dalei)
Western pygmyfly (Nannophya occidentalis)
Scarlet dwarf (Nannophya pygmaea)
Nannophyopsis clara
Neodythemis afra
Neodythemis campioni
Neodythemis klingi
Neodythemis preussi
Stripe-fronted dryad (Nephepeltia leonardina)
Spine-bellied dryad (Nephepeltia phryne)
Eastern blacktail (Nesciothemis farinosa)
Nesciothemis fitzgeraldi
Small blacktail (Nesciothemis minor)
Northern redtail (Nesciothemis nigeriensis)
Western blacktail (Nesciothemis pujoli)
Nesoxenia lineata
Neurothemis fluctuans
Neurothemis fulvia
Neurothemis intermedia
Neurothemis ramburii
Neurothemis terminata
Neurothemis tullia
Eastern forestwatcher (Notiothemis jonesi)
Western forestwatcher (Notiothemis robertsi)
Oligoclada abbreviata
Oligoclada monosticha
Oligoclada teretidentis
Bottletail (Olpogastra lugubris)
Onychothemis culminicola
Onychothemis testacea
Orchithemis pruinans
Orchithemis pulcherrima
Yellow-lined skimmer (Orthemis biolleyi)
Concolored skimmer (Orthemis concolor)
Roseate skimmer (Orthemis ferruginea)
Orthemis nodiplaga
Regal skimmer (Orthemis regalis)
Orthemis sulphurata
Orthemis tambopatae
Abbott's skimmer (Orthetrum abbotti)
Orthetrum africanum
White-tailed skimmer (Orthetrum albistylum)
Many-celled skimmer (Orthetrum angustiventre)
Giant skimmer (Orthetrum austeni)
Orthetrum azureum
Speckled skimmer (Orthetrum balteatum)
Banded skimmer (Orthetrum brachiale)
Southern skimmer (Orthetrum brunneum)
Two-striped skimmer (Orthetrum caffrum)
One-spriped skimmer (Orthetrum camerunense)
Black-tailed skimmer (Orthetrum cancellatum)
Orthetrum chrysis
Epaulet skimmer (Orthetrum chrysostigma)
Keeled skimmer (Orthetrum coerulescens)
Orthetrum glaucum
Guinea skimmer (Orthetrum guineense)
Dark-shouldered skimmer (Orthetrum hintzi)
Spectacled skimmer (Orthetrum icteromelas)
Orthetrum japonicum
Julia skimmer (Orthetrum julia)
Orthetrum kollmannspergeri
Orthetrum kristenseni
Orthetrum latihami
Orthetrum lineostigma
Orthetrum luzonicum
Highland skimmer (Orthetrum machadoi)
Orthetrum macrostigma
Orthetrum melania
Farmbush skimmer (Orthetrum microstigma)
Rosy skimmer (Orthetrum migratum)
Woodland skimmer (Orthetrum monardi)
Orthetrum pruinosum
Ransonnet's skimmer (Orthetrum ransonnetii)
Robust skimmer (Orthetrum robustum)
Slender skimmer (Orthetrum sabina)
Orthetrum saegeri
Green skimmer (Orthetrum serapia)
Bold skimmer (Orthetrum stemmale)
Small skimmer (Orthetrum taeniolatum)
Orthetrum testaceum
Orthetrum triangulare
Long skimmer (Orthetrum trinacria)
Pepperpants (Oxythemis phoenicosceles)
Palpopleura albifrons
Deceptive widow (Palpopleura deceptor)
Yellow-veined widow (Palpopleura jucunda)
Lucia widow (Palpopleura lucia)
Portia widow (Palpopleura portia)
Palpopleura sexmaculata
Palpopleura vestita
Wandering glider (Pantala flavescens)
Banded duskdarter (Parazyxomma flavicans)
Orange amberwing (Perithemis cornelia)
Slough amberwing (Perithemis domitia)
Golden amberwing (Perithemis electra)
Perithemis icteroptera
Fine-banded amberwing (Perithemis lais)
Clear-tipped amberwing (Perithemis parzefalli)
Ruby amberwing (Perithemis rubita)
Scarlet spiderlegs (Planiplax arachne)
Planiplax erythropyga
Porpax asperipes
Porpax bipunctus
Porpax garambensis
Porpax risi
Porpax sentipes
Swampwatcher (Potamarcha congener)
Protorthemis woodfordi
Pseudothemis jorina
Pied skimmer (Pseudothemis zonata)
Cardinal redskimmer (Rhodopygia cardinalis)
Rhodopygia hinei
Slender redskimmer (Rhodopygia hollandi)
Rhodothemis rufa
Rhyothemis apicalis
Rhyothemis aterrima
Rhyothemis cognata
Skylight flutterer (Rhyothemis fenestrina)
Rhyothemis fuliginosa
Mariposa flutterer (Rhyothemis mariposa)
Veiled flutterer (Rhyothemis notata)
Rhyothemis obsolescens
Yellow-striped flutterer (Rhyothemis phyllis)
Rhyothemis plutonia
Sapphire flutterer (Rhyothemis princeps)
Phantom flutterer (Rhyothemis semihyalina)
Rhyothemis triangularis
Rhyothemis variegata
Risiophlebia dohrni
Black pennant (Selysiothemis nigra)
Blue-faced meadowhawk (Sympetrum ambiguum)
Sympetrum arenicolor
Sympetrum baccha
Sympetrum commixtum
Sympetrum darwinianum
Sympetrum eroticum
Yellow-winged darter (Sympetrum flaveolum)
Red-veined darter (Sympetrum fonscolombii)
Sympetrum haematoneura
Dwarf darter (Sympetrum haritonovi)
Sympetrum hypomelas
Cardinal meadowhawk (Sympetrum illotum)
Sympetrum infuscatum
Cherry-faced meadowhawk (Sympetrum internum)
Red-veined meadowhawk (Sympetrum madidum)
Southern darter (Sympetrum meridionale)
Island darter (Sympetrum nigrifemur)
Talamanca meadowhawk (Sympetrum nigrocreatum)
Sympetrum parvulum
Banded darter (Sympetrum pedemontanum)
Ruddy darter (Sympetrum sanguineum)
Desert darter (Sympetrum sinaiticum)
Common darter (Sympetrum striolatum)
Vagrant darter (Sympetrum vulgatum)
Forest elf (Tetrathemis camerunensis)
Club-tailed elfe (Tetrathemis corduliformis)
Tetrathemis godiardi
Rainforest elf (Tetrathemis irregularis)
Tetrathemis longfieldae
Tetrathemis platyptera
Black-splashed elf (Tetrathemis polleni)
Dash-winged piedface (Thermochoria equivocata)
Clear-winged piedface (Thermochoria jeanneli)
Thermorthemis madagascariensis
Old world twister (Tholymis tillarga)
Keyhole glider (Tramea basilaris)
Striped saddlebags (Tramea calverti)
Carolina saddlebags (Tramea carolina)
Ferruginous glider (Tramea limbata)
Tramea loewii
Red-mantled saddlebags (Tramea onusta)
Tramea rustica
Red glider dragonfly (Tramea transmarina)
Tramea virginia
Halfshade dropwing (Trithemis aconita)
Bronze dropwing (Trithemis aenea)
Western phantom dropwing (Trithemis africana)
Violet dropwing (Trithemis annulata)
Trithemis anomala
Trithemis apicalis
Red-veined dropwing (Trithemis arteriosa)
Crimson marsh glider (Trithemis aurora)
Trithemis basitincta
Trithemis bifida
Trithemis bredoi
Trithemis congolica
Trithemis dejouxi
Black dropwing (Trithemis dichroa)
Denim dropwing (Trithemis donaldsoni)
Highland dropwing (Trithemis dorsalis)
Trithemis dubia
Trithemis ellenbeckii
Black stream glider (Trithemis festiva)
Navy dropwing (Trithemis furva)
Trithemis grouti
Silhouette dropwing (Trithemis hecate)
Copycat dropwing (Trithemis imitata)
Albertine dropwing (Trithemis integra)
Trithemis kalula
Orange-winged dropwing (Trithemis kirbyi)
Trithemis leakeyi
Trithemis lilacina
Trithemis longistyla
Monard's dropwing (Trithemis monardi)
Hairy-legged dropwing (Trithemis nuptialis)
Long-legged marsh glider (Trithemis pallidinervis)
Russet dropwing (Trithemis pluvialis)
Cobalt dropwing (Trithemis pruinata)
Jaunty dropwing (Trithemis stictica)
Eastern phantom dropwing (Trithemis tropicana)
Elegant dropwing (Trithemis werneri)
Trithetrum congoense
Fiery darter (Trithetrum navasi)
Tyriobapta torrida
Red basker (Urothemis assignata)
Blue basker (Urothemis edwardsii)
Urothemis signata
Rainforest bluewing (Zenithoptera fasciata)
Zenithoptera viola
Zygonoides fraseri
Southern riverking (Zygonoides fuelleborni)
Zygonoides occidentis
Zygonyx asahinai
Zygonyx atritibiae
Zygonyx chrysobaphes
Zygonyx elisabethae
Zygonyx eusebia
Ensign cascader (Zygonyx flavicosta)
Zygonyx geminunca
Zygonyx ida
Zygonyx iris
Blue cascader (Zygonyx natalensis)
Regal cascader (Zygonyx regisalberti)
Zygonyx speciosus
Zygonyx takasago
Ringed cascader (Zygonyx torridus)
Smoky duskdarter (Zyxomma atlanticum)
Zyxomma multinervinervis
Long-tailed duskdarter (Zyxomma petiolatum)

Subspecies

Acisoma panorpoides ascalaphoides
Orthetrum coerulescens anceps
Orthetrum julia falsum

Polythorids

Glitterwing (Chalcopteryx rutilans)
Tepui bannerwing (Chalcothore montgomeryi)
Black-banded bannerwing (Cora aurea)
Cora irene
Cora jocosa
Cora klenei
Cora marina
Cora terminalis
Euthore fassli
Euthore fastigiata
Euthore meridana
Polythore aurora
Polythore boliviana
Polythore concinna
Polythore derivata
Polythore lamerceda
Polythore manua
Polythore mutata
Polythore ornata
Polythore spaeteri
Polythore terminata
Polythore victoria

Other Odonata species

Devadatta argyoides
Devadatta cyanocephala
Devadatta ducatrix
Tropical rockmaster (Diphlebia euphoeoides)
Whitewater rockmaster (Diphlebia lestoides)
Gomphomacromia fallax
White-dotted redspot (Hypopetalia pestilens)
Idionyx carinata
Idionyx claudia
Idionyx iida
Idionyx intricata
Idionyx philippa
Idionyx rhinoceroides
Idionyx selysi
Idionyx stevensi
Idionyx thailandica
Idomacromia lieftincki
Idomacromia proavita
Isosticta spinipes
Macromidia donaldi
Macromidia genialis
Macromidia ishidai
Macromidia kelloggi
Macromidia rapida
Macromidia samal
Forest mosquitohawk (Micromidia atrifrons)
Neophya rutherfordi
Chilean petaltail (Phenes raptor)
Philoganga montana
Ochre titan (Philoganga vetusta)
Narrow-flanged redspot (Phyllopetalia apicalis)
Apollo redspot (Phyllopetalia apollo)
Pudu redspot (Phyllopetalia pudu)
Northern wiretail (Rhadinosticta banksi)
Pantepui relict damsel (Rimanella arcana)
Gray petaltail (Tachopteryx thoreyi)
Tanymecosticta fissicollis
Bush giant dragonfly (Uropetala carovei)
Mountain giant dragonfly (Uropetala chiltoni)

See also 
 Lists of IUCN Red List least concern species
 List of near threatened arthropods
 List of vulnerable arthropods
 List of endangered arthropods
 List of critically endangered arthropods
 List of recently extinct arthropods
 List of data deficient arthropods

References 

Arthropods
Least concern arthropods
Least concern arthropods